= Nationality =

Status of being a member or citizen of a particular nation

Nationality is the legal status of belonging to a particular nation, defined as a group of people organized in one country, under one legal jurisdiction, or a group of people who are united by a common culture, history, traditions, and awareness of a common origin.

In international law, nationality is a legal identification establishing the person as a subject, a national, of a sovereign state. It affords the state jurisdiction over the person and affords the person the protection of the state against other states. The rights and duties of nationals vary from state to state, and are often complemented by citizenship law, in some contexts to the point where citizenship is synonymous with nationality. However, nationality differs technically and legally from citizenship, which is a different legal relationship between a person and a country. The noun "national" can include both citizens and non-citizens. The most common distinguishing feature of citizenship is that citizens have the right to participate in the political life of the state, such as by voting or standing for election. However, in most modern countries all nationals are citizens of the state, and full citizens are always nationals of the state.

In international law, a "stateless person" is someone who is "not considered as a national by any state under the operation of its law". To address this, Article 15 of the Universal Declaration of Human Rights states that "Everyone has the right to a nationality", and "No one shall be arbitrarily deprived of his nationality nor denied the right to change his nationality", even though, by international custom and conventions, it is the right of each state to determine who its nationals are. Such determinations are part of nationality law. In some cases, determinations of nationality are also governed by public international law—for example, by treaties on statelessness or the European Convention on Nationality. For when a person lacks nationality, globally only 23 countries have established dedicated statelessness determination procedures. Even where such procedures exist, they still have shortcomings in accessibility and functionality, preventing stateless people from accessing rights connected to being determined stateless.

The general process of acquiring nationality is called naturalization. Each state determines in its nationality law the conditions (statute) under which it will recognize persons as its nationals, and the conditions under which that status will be withdrawn. Some countries permit their nationals to have multiple nationalities, while others insist on exclusive allegiance.

Due to the etymology of nationality, in older texts or other languages the word "nationality", rather than "ethnicity", is often used to refer to an ethnic group (a group of people who share a common ethnic identity, language, culture, lineage, history, and so forth). Individuals may also be considered nationals of groups with autonomous status that have ceded some power to a larger sovereign state.

Nationality is also employed as a term for national identity, with some cases of identity politics and nationalism conflating the legal nationality as well as ethnicity with a national identity.

== International law ==
Nationality is the status that allows a nation to grant rights to the subject and to impose obligations upon the subject. In most cases, no rights or obligations are automatically attached to this status, although the status is a necessary precondition for any rights and obligations created by the state.

In European law, nationality is the status or relationship that gives the nation the right to protect a person from other nations. Diplomatic and consular protection are dependent upon this relationship between the person and the state. A person's status as being the national of a country is used to resolve the conflict of laws.

Within the broad limits imposed by a few treaties and international law, states may freely define who are and are not their nationals. However, since the Nottebohm case, other states are only required to respect the claim(s) by a state to protect an alleged national if the nationality is based on a true social bond. In the case of dual nationality, the states may determine the most effective nationality for the person, to determine which state's laws are the most relevant. There are also limits on removing a person's status as a national. Article 15 of the Universal Declaration of Human Rights states that "Everyone has the right to a nationality," and "No one shall be arbitrarily deprived of his nationality nor denied the right to change his nationality."

== Determining factors ==
A person can be recognized or granted nationality on a number of bases. Usually, nationality based on circumstances of birth is automatic, but an application may be required.

- Nationality by family (jus sanguinis). If one or both of a person's parents are citizens of a given state, then the person may have the right to be a citizen of that state as well. (Note: Examples: Philippines, United States.) Formerly this might only have applied through the paternal line, but sex equality became common since the late twentieth century. Citizenship is granted based on ancestry or ethnicity and is related to the concept of a nation state common in Europe. Where jus sanguinis holds, a person born outside a country, one or both of whose parents are citizens of the country, is also a citizen. Some states (United Kingdom, Canada) limit the right to citizenship by descent to a certain number of generations born outside the state; others (Germany, Ireland, Switzerland) grant citizenship only if each new generation is registered with the relevant foreign mission within a specified deadline; while others (Italy, for example) have no limitation on the number of generations born abroad who can claim citizenship of their ancestors' country. This form of citizenship is common in civil law countries.
- Nationality by birth (jus soli). Some people are automatically nationals of the state in which they are born. This form of citizenship originated in England, where those who were born within the realm were subjects of the monarch (a concept pre-dating that of citizenship in England) and is common in common law countries. Most countries in the Americas grant unconditional jus soli citizenship, while it has been limited or abolished in almost all other countries.
  - In many cases, both jus soli and jus sanguinis hold citizenship either by place or parentage (or both).
- Nationality by marriage (jus matrimonii). Many countries fast-track naturalization based on the marriage of a person to a citizen. Countries that are destinations for such immigration often have regulations to try to detect sham marriages, where a citizen marries a non-citizen typically for payment, without them having the intention of living together. Many countries (United Kingdom, Germany, United States, Canada) allow citizenship by marriage only if the foreign spouse is a permanent resident of the country in which citizenship is sought; others (Switzerland, Luxembourg) allow foreign spouses of expatriate citizens to obtain citizenship after a certain period of marriage, and sometimes also subject to language skills and proof of cultural integration (e.g. regular visits to the spouse's country of citizenship).
- Naturalization. States normally grant nationality to people who have entered the country legally and been granted a permit to stay, or been granted political asylum, and also lived there for a specified period. In some countries, naturalization is subject to conditions which may include passing a test demonstrating reasonable knowledge of the language or way of life of the host country, good conduct (no serious criminal record), and moral character (such as drunkenness, or gambling, or an understanding of the nature of drunkenness, or gambling) vowing allegiance to their new state or its ruler and renouncing their prior citizenship. Some states allow dual citizenship and do not require naturalized citizens to formally renounce any other citizenship.
- Nationality by investment or economic citizenship. Wealthy people invest money in property or businesses, buy government bonds or simply donate cash directly, in exchange for citizenship and a passport. Whilst legitimate and usually limited in quota, the schemes are controversial. Costs for citizenship by investment range from as little as $100,000 (£74,900) to as much as €2.5m (£2.19m).

== Legal protections ==
The following instruments address the right to a nationality:

- Convention Relating to the Status of Refugees
- Protocol Relating to the Status of Refugees
- Convention Relating to the Status of Stateless Persons
- Convention on the Reduction of Statelessness
- European Convention on Nationality
- African Charter on the Rights and Welfare of the Child (art. 6)
- American Convention on Human Rights (art. 20)
- American Declaration of the Rights and Duties of Man (art. 19)
- Arab Charter on Human Rights (art. 24)
- Convention on the Elimination of All Forms of Discrimination Against Women (art. 9)
- International Convention on the Elimination of All Forms of Racial Discrimination (art. 5(d)(iii))
- Convention on the Rights of Persons with Disabilities (art. 18)
- Convention on the Rights of the Child (arts. 7 and 8)
- Council of Europe Convention on the Avoidance of Statelessness in Relation to State Succession
- International Covenant on Civil and Political Rights (art. 24(3))
- Protocol to the African Charter on Human and Peoples' Rights on the Rights of Women in Africa (Maputo Protocol) (art. 6(g) and (h))
- Universal Declaration of Human Rights (art. 15)

== National law ==
Nationals normally have the right to enter or return to the country they belong to. Passports are issued to nationals of a state, rather than only to citizens, because a passport is a travel document used to enter the country. However, nationals may not have the right of abode (the right to live permanently) in the countries that granted them passports.

== Nationality versus citizenship ==
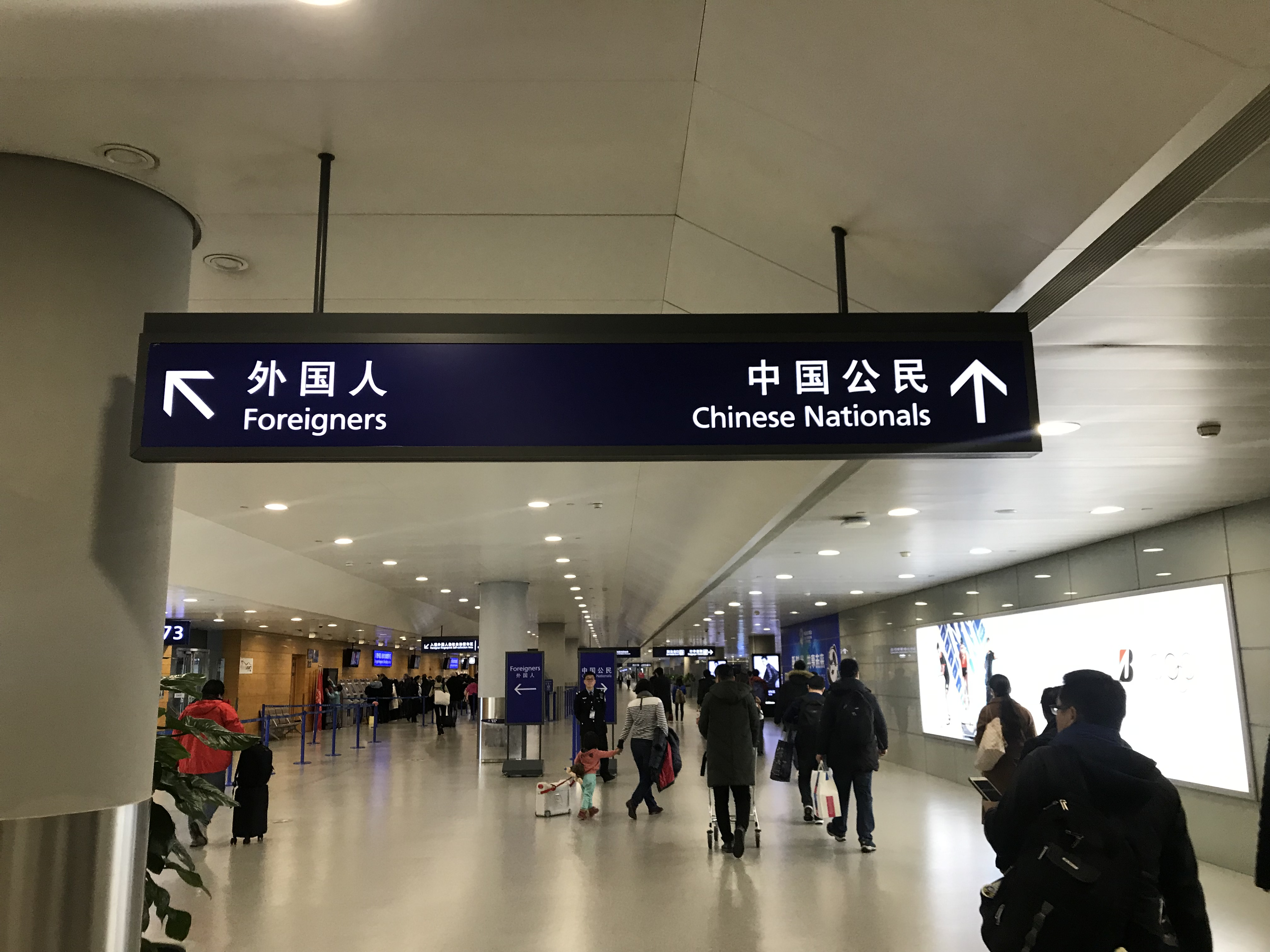
A border control sign at Shanghai Pudong International Airport with the English term 'Chinese nationals' and the Chinese term 中国公民 ('Chinese citizens')

Citizenship and nationality are different aspects of membership of a state. Nationality is the status of the member in an international context, while citizenship is focused on a member's rights in the internal political life of the state. Historically, the most significant difference is that a citizen has the right to vote for elected officials, and the right to be elected. Today, the concept of full citizenship encompasses not only active political rights, but full civil rights and social rights. All citizens are nationals, but not all nationals are necessarily citizens.

The distinction between full citizenship and lesser relationships dates back to antiquity. Until the 19th and 20th centuries, it was typical for only some members of a state to be full citizens. Many people were excluded from citizenship on the basis of sex, socioeconomic class, ethnicity, religion, and other factors. However, non-citizens had a legal relationship with their government akin to the modern concept of nationality.

== Nationality in context ==
United States nationality law defines some persons born in some of the US outlying possessions as US nationals but not citizens. British nationality law defines six classes of British national, among which "British citizen" is one class (having the right of abode in the United Kingdom, along with some "British subjects"). Similarly, in the Republic of China, commonly known as Taiwan, the status of national without household registration applies to people who have the Republic of China nationality, but do not have an automatic entitlement to enter or reside in the Taiwan Area, and do not qualify for civic rights and duties there. Under the nationality laws of Mexico, Colombia, and some other Latin American countries, nationals do not become citizens until they turn the age of majority.

List of nationalities which do not have full citizenship rights:

Country	Form of nationality without full citizenship rights	Description
United Kingdom	All forms of British nationalities except British Citizen	Among the 6 forms of British nationality, only British Citizens have the automatic right of abode in the United Kingdom, Isle of Man and Channel Islands, all the others do not have an automatic right to enter and live in the UK at all. Although the status of a British Overseas Territories citizen (BOTC) is derived from a connection of an overseas territory, it does not guarantee belonger status in that territory (which confers citizenship rights) as it is defined by the law of the territory itself which may be different from the British nationality law.
Latvia	Non-citizens (Latvia)	This is the status conferred to people who were legal residents in Latvia upon restoring independence, but not eligible for Latvian citizenship—mainly ethnic Russians who migrated during the Soviet occupation period.
Estonia	Undefined citizenship	This is the term used to denote the legal residents in Estonia upon restoring independence who are not eligible for Estonian citizenship—mainly ethnic Russians who migrated during the Soviet occupation period.
Taiwan (Republic of China)	National without household registration	Rights in Taiwan are granted by both having the nationality and a household registration there. Without a household registration a person does not have automatic right to enter or live in Taiwan. These are mainly overseas ethnic Chinese who have right to the Republic of China nationality under the nationality law.
China	Chinese nationals migrated to either Hong Kong or Macau in a one-way permit but who have not yet taken up permanent residence	These people, although technically Chinese nationals, are unable to vote or apply for a passport anywhere because rights in mainland China are associated with household registration which is relinquished upon migration, but rights in the SARs (e.g. right to vote and right to hold a passport) are given to permanent residents which is only eligible after 7 years of continuous residence. (They are eligible for applying Hong Kong Document of Identity for Visa Purposes or Macao Special Administrative Region Travel Permit as travel documents.)
United States	US nationals who are not US citizens	These people, mainly American Samoan, have the right to enter, work, and live in the United States as permanent residents but do not have the same voting rights as citizens and are barred from holding certain public offices that are restricted to citizens only.
Uruguay	"Non-national citizens"	Certain interpretation of the Constitution of Uruguay leads to the belief that the language of the Constitution divides citizens into "nationals" and "non-national citizens".

Even if the nationality law classifies people with the same nationality on paper (de jure), the right conferred can be different according to the place of birth or residence, creating different de facto classes of nationality, sometimes with different passports as well. For example, although Chinese nationality law operates uniformly in China, including Hong Kong and Macau SARs, with all Chinese nationals classified the same under the nationality law, in reality local laws, in mainland and also in the SARs, govern the right of Chinese nationals in their respective territories which give vastly different rights, including different passports, to Chinese nationals according to their birthplace or residence place, effectively making a distinction between Chinese national of mainland China, Hong Kong or Macau, both domestically and internationally. The United Kingdom had a similar distinction as well before 1983, where all nationals with a connection to the UK or one of the colonies were classified as Citizens of the United Kingdom and Colonies, but their rights were different depending on the connection under different laws, which was formalised into different classes of nationalities under the British Nationality Act 1981.

== Nationality versus ethnicity ==
Nationality is sometimes used simply as an alternative word for ethnicity or national origin, just as some people assume that citizenship and nationality are identical. In some countries, the cognate word for nationality in local language may be understood as a synonym of ethnicity or as an identifier of cultural and family-based self-determination, rather than on relations with a state or current government. For example, some Kurds say that they have Kurdish nationality, even though there is no Kurdish sovereign state at this time in history.

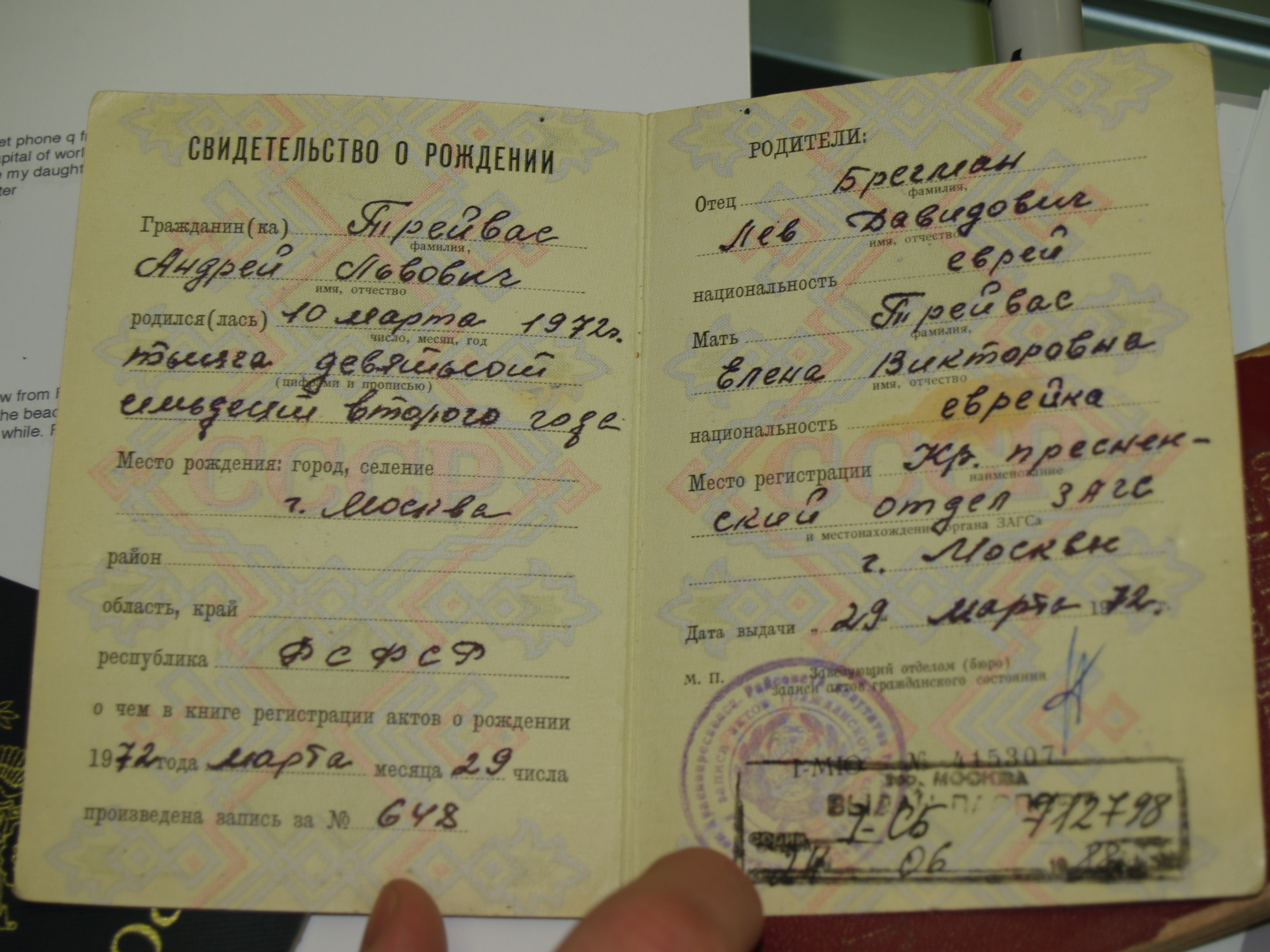
A Soviet birth certificate, in which the nacional'nost' of both parents (here both Jewish) was recorded. These records were subsequently used to determine the ethnicity of the child, as specified in his internal passport.

In the context of former Soviet Union and former Socialist Federal Republic of Yugoslavia, "nationality" is often used as translation of the Russian nacional'nost' and Serbo-Croatian narodnost, which were the terms used in those countries for ethnic groups and local affiliations within the member states of the federation. In the Soviet Union, more than 100 such groups were formally recognized. Membership in these groups was identified on Soviet internal passports, and recorded in censuses in both the USSR and Yugoslavia. In the early years of the Soviet Union's existence, ethnicity was usually determined by the person's native language, and sometimes through religion or cultural factors, such as clothing. Children born after the revolution were categorized according to their parents' recorded ethnicities. Many of these ethnic groups are still recognized by modern Russia and other countries.

Similarly, the term nationalities of China refers to ethnic and cultural groups in China. Spain is one nation, made up of nationalities, which are not politically recognized as nations (state), but can be considered smaller nations within the Spanish nation. Spanish law recognizes the autonomous communities of Andalusia, Aragon, Balearic Islands, Canary Islands, Catalonia, Valencia, Galicia and the Basque Country as "nationalities" (nacionalidades).

In 2013, the Supreme Court of Israel unanimously affirmed the position that "citizenship" (e.g. Israeli) is separate from le'om (Hebrew: לאום; "nationality" or "ethnic affiliation"; e.g. Jewish, Arab, Druze, Circassian), and that the existence of a unique "Israeli" le'om has not been proven. Israel recognizes more than 130 le'umim in total.

The older ethnicity meaning of "nationality" is not defined by political borders or passport ownership and includes nations that lack an independent state (such as the Assyrians, Scots, Welsh, English, Andalusians, Basques, Catalans, Kurds, Punjabis, Kabyles, Baluchs, Pashtuns, Berbers, Bosniaks, Palestinians, Hmong, Inuit, Copts, Māori, Wakhis, Xhosas and Zulus, among others).

== Nationality versus national identity ==
National identity is person's subjective sense of belonging to one state or to one nation. A person may be a national of a state, in the sense of being its citizen, without subjectively or emotionally feeling a part of that state, for example a migrant may identify with their ancestral and/or religious background rather than with the state of which they are citizens. Conversely, a person may feel that they belong to one state without having any legal relationship to it. For example, children who were brought to the US illegally when quite young and grew up there while having little contact with their native country and their culture often have a national identity of feeling American, despite legally being nationals of a different country.

== Dual nationality ==
Dual nationality is when a single person has a formal relationship with two separate, sovereign states. This might occur, for example, if a person's parents are nationals of separate countries, and the mother's country claims all offspring of the mother's as their own nationals, but the father's country claims all offspring of the father's.

Nationality, with its historical origins in allegiance to a sovereign monarch, was seen originally as a permanent, inherent, unchangeable condition, and later, when a change of allegiance was permitted, as a strictly exclusive relationship, so that becoming a national of one state required rejecting the previous state.

Dual nationality was considered a problem that caused a conflict between states and sometimes imposed mutually exclusive requirements on affected people, such as simultaneously serving in two countries' military forces. Through the middle of the 20th century, many international agreements were focused on reducing the possibility of dual nationality. Since then, many accords recognizing and regulating dual nationality have been formed.

== Statelessness ==
Statelessness is the condition in which an individual has no formal or protective relationship with any state. There are various reasons why a person can become stateless. This might occur, for example, if a person's parents are nationals of separate countries, and the mother's country rejects all offspring of mothers married to foreign fathers, but the father's country rejects all offspring born to foreign mothers. People in this situation may not legally be the national of any state despite possession of an emotional national identity.

Another stateless situation arises when a person holds a travel document (passport) which recognizes the bearer as having the nationality of a "state" which is not internationally recognized, has no entry into the International Organization for Standardization's country list, is not a member of the United Nations, etc. In the current era, persons native to Taiwan who hold passports of Republic of China are one example.

Some countries (like Kuwait, the UAE, and Saudi Arabia) can also remove one's citizenship; the reasons for removal can be fraud and/or security issues. There are also people who are abandoned at birth and the parents' whereabouts are not known.

=== De jure vs de facto statelessness ===
Nationality law defines nationality and statelessness. Nationality is awarded based on two well-known principles: jus sanguinis and jus soli. Jus sanguinis translated from Latin means "right of blood". According to this principle, nationality is awarded if the parent(s) of the person are nationals of that country. Jus soli is referred to as "birthright citizenship". It means, anyone born in the territory of the country is awarded nationality of that country.

Statelessness is defined thus in the 1954 Statelessness Convention: "For the purpose of this Convention, the term 'stateless person' means a person who is not considered as a national by any State under the operation of its law." A person can become stateless because of administrative reasons. For example, "A person may be at risk of statelessness if she is born in a State that applies jus sanguinis while her parents were born in a State that applies jus soli, leaving the person ineligible for citizenship in both States due to conflicting laws." Moreover, there are countries in which if a person does not reside for a specified period of time, they can automatically lose their nationality. To protect those individuals from being deemed "stateless", the 1961 Statelessness Convention places limitations on nationality laws.

== Conferment of nationality ==
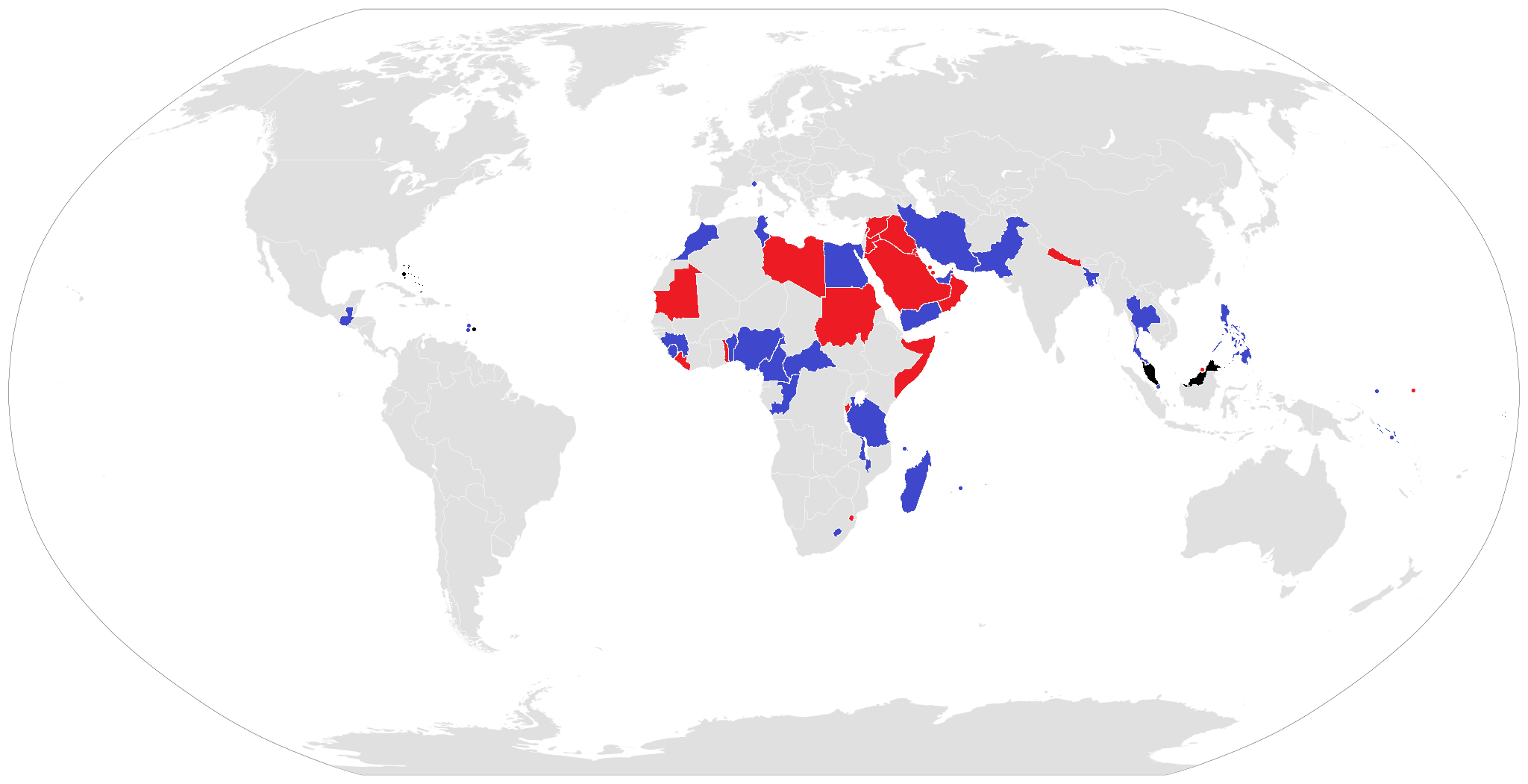
By state: Unmarried fathers are unable to confer nationality on their children Mothers are unable to confer nationality on their children and spouses Women are unable to confer nationality on spouses and/or acquire, change, and retain their nationality

The following list includes states in which parents are able to confer nationality on their children or spouses.

=== Africa ===
Nationality law in Africa
Country:	Unmarried fathers able to confer nationality on children	Mothers able to confer nationality on children	Women able to confer nationality on spouses
Benin	Yes	Yes	No
Burundi	Yes	No (Note: In Burundi, women nationals can confer their nationality on their children if their children are born out of wedlock to unknown fathers or their fathers disown them.)	No
Cameroon	Yes	Yes	No
Central African Republic	Yes	Yes	No
Comoros	Yes	Yes	No
(Republic of the Congo) Congo	Yes	Yes	No
Egypt	Yes	Yes	No
Eswatini	Yes	No	No
Guinea	Yes	Yes	No
Lesotho	Yes	Yes	No
Liberia	Yes	No (Note: Women only can confer their nationality on their children who are born in the nation; children born abroad can not acquire citizenship.)	Yes
Libya	Yes	No (Note: Women nationals can confer their nationality on their children whose fathers are stateless, whose fathers' identities or nationalities are unknown, or whose fathers do not establish filiation with such children.)	No
Madagascar	Yes	Yes (Note: In Madagascar, mothers can confer nationality on children born in wedlock if the father is stateless or of unknown nationality. Children born out of wedlock or to Madagascan mothers and foreign fathers can apply to the nationality until they reach majority.)	No
Malawi	Yes	Yes	No
Mauritania	Yes	No	No
Mauritius	Yes	Yes	No
Morocco	Yes	Yes	No
Nigeria	Yes	Yes	No
Sierra Leone	Yes	Yes	No
Somalia	Yes	No	No
Sudan	Yes	No	No
Tanzania	Yes	Yes	No
Togo	Yes	No	No
Tunisia	Yes	Yes	No

=== Americas ===
Nationality law in North America
Nation:	Unmarried fathers able to confer nationality on children	Mothers able to confer nationality on children	Women able to confer nationality on spouses
Canada	Yes	Yes	Yes (Note: Irrespective of gender, Canadian citizens (nationals) can sponsor their spouse, common-law partner, or conjugal partner, for permanent residency in Canada. Permanent residents then can apply for citizenship by naturalization after living in Canada for three years.)
Mexico	Yes	Yes	No
United States	Yes	Yes	Yes

Nationality law in the Caribbean
Country:	Unmarried fathers able to confer nationality on children	Mothers able to confer nationality on children	Women able to confer nationality on spouses
(The Bahamas) Bahamas	No	No	No
Barbados	No	No	No
Saint Lucia	Yes	Yes	No
Saint Vincent and the Grenadines	Yes	Yes	No

Nationality law in Central America
Country:	Unmarried fathers able to confer nationality on children	Mothers able to confer nationality on children	Women able to confer nationality on spouses
Belize	Yes	Yes	Yes
Costa Rica	Yes	Yes	No
El Salvador	Yes	Yes	No
Guatemala	Yes	Yes	No
Honduras	Yes	Yes	Yes
Nicaragua	Unknown	Unknown	Unknown
Panama	Unknown	Unknown	Unknown

Nationality law in South America
Country:	Unmarried fathers able to confer nationality on children	Mothers able to confer nationality on children	Women able to confer nationality on spouses
Argentina	Unknown	Unknown	Unknown
Bolivia	Unknown	Unknown	Unknown
Brazil	Yes	Yes	Yes
Chile	Unknown	Unknown	Unknown
Colombia	Yes	Yes	Yes
Ecuador	Unknown	Unknown	Unknown
Guyana	Unknown	Unknown	Unknown
Paraguay	Unknown	Unknown	Unknown
Peru	Unknown	Unknown	Unknown
Suriname	Unknown	Unknown	Unknown
Uruguay	Yes	Yes	Yes
Venezuela	Unknown	Unknown	Unknown

=== Asia ===
Nationality law in Asia
Country:	Unmarried fathers able to confer nationality on children	Mothers able to confer nationality on children	Women able to confer nationality on spouses
Armenia	Yes	Yes	Yes
Bahrain	Yes	No	No
Bangladesh	Yes	Yes	No
Brunei	Yes	No	No
India	Yes	Yes	Yes
Iran	Yes	Yes (Note: On 14 May 2019, the Iranian Islamic Consultative Assembly approved an amendment to their nationality law, in which women married to men with a foreign nationality should request to confer nationality on children under age 18, while children and spouses of Iranian men are granted nationality automatically. However, the Guardian Council should approve the amendment. On 2 October 2019, the Guardian Council agreed to sign the bill into a law, taking into account the background checks on foreign fathers.)	No
Iraq	Yes	No (Note: In Iraq, nationality law limits the ability of Iraqi women to confer nationality on children who are born without the nation.)	No
Israel	Yes	Yes	Yes
Jordan	Yes	No	No
Kuwait	Yes	No (Note: In Kuwait, a person whose father is unknown or whose paternity has not been established may apply for Kuwaiti citizenship upon the age of majority.)	No
Lebanon	Yes	No (Note: In Lebanon, women only can confer their citizenship on their children who are born out of wedlock and whose Lebanese mother recognizes them as her children during such children's minority.)	No
Malaysia	No	No	No
Nepal	Yes	No	No
Oman	Yes	No	No
Pakistan	Yes	Yes	No
Philippines	Yes	Yes	No
Qatar	Yes	No	No
Russia	Yes	Yes	Yes
Saudi Arabia	Yes	No	No
Singapore	Yes	Yes	No
Syria	Yes	No (Note: In Syria, mothers only can confer nationality on their children who are born in Syria and whose fathers do not establish filiation of such children.)	No
Thailand	Yes	Yes	No
United Arab Emirates	Yes	Yes (Note: In United Arab Emirates, mothers only can confer nationality on their children who have lived in the UAE for at least six years.)	No
Yemen	Yes	Yes	No

=== Europe ===
Nationality law in Europe
Country:	Unmarried fathers able to confer nationality on children	Mothers able to confer nationality on children	Women able to confer nationality on spouses
Germany	Yes	Yes	Yes
Monaco	Yes	Yes	No
Ukraine	Yes	Yes	Yes

== See also ==
- Blood quantum laws
- Demonym
- Discrimination based on nationality
- Imagined communities
- Intersectionality
- jus sanguinis
- jus soli
- List of adjectival and demonymic forms for countries and nations
- Nottebohm (Liechtenstein v. Guatemala), a 1955 case that is cited for its definitions of nationality
- Second-class citizen
- People
- Volk
