= Clarence Yongo =

Cameroonian journalist

- Education: Master's degree in Information and Communication Sciences
- Alma mater: ESSTIC
- Occupations: Journalist, Television Host
- Years active: 2002–present
- Known for: Founding a 100% female television channel
- Notable work: Mama (journal), campaign director for Yeli Monique Kam

Clarence Yongo is a Cameroonian journalist and television host. A feminist, she founded a 100% female television channel. She successfully led a presidential candidacy in Central Africa.

== Biography ==
=== Early life ===
Clarence Yongo discovered journalism within the journalism club at Tsinga High School in the political capital, Yaoundé. She holds a master's degree in Information and Communication Sciences from the Higher School of Information and Communication Sciences and Technologies ESSTIC.

She worked at Canal 2 International and Sweet FM until 2018, after sixteen years of loyal service.

=== Career ===
After being recruited by Sweet FM in 2002, Clarence Yongo later launched the specialized journal Mama. She also founded companies specializing in e-reputation and communication.

In 2013, she became a consultant on structuring projects in Cameroon. In political communication, Clarence Yongo worked for key figures in the ruling party, the Cameroon People's Democratic Movement.

In 2017, she worked on the image of the candidate in the Cameroonian presidential election 2018, Serge Espoir Matomba.

In 2020, she had a new professional experience when she was appointed campaign director for Mrs. Yeli Monique Kam, a candidate in the presidential election in Burkina Faso.

== Awards ==
2021: Winner of the SESHAT Prize for Female Courage in Cameroonian Journalism

== Controversy ==
2021: She stated, "the place of a rapist is in prison and not on a television set," referring to the presenter Yves de Mbella.
