= Foly Dirane =

Cameroonian radio presenter and media personality

- Born: 1958; Cameroon
- Died: 26 March 2026 (aged 67–68); Cameroon
- Occupations: Radio presenter; media personality
- Years active: 1990s–2020s
- Known for: Host of the radio program Délire

Foly Dirane was a Cameroonian radio presenter and media personality, best known as the host of the popular entertainment radio program Délire. He was regarded as a prominent figure in Cameroonian broadcasting and youth-oriented media programming.

== Early life and background ==
Information regarding Foly Dirane's early life, including his date of birth and formal education, is limited in publicly available sources. He was born in Cameroon and later became involved in media and youth engagement initiatives.

== Career ==
=== Radio and media work ===
Foly Dirane gained national recognition as the host of the radio program Délire, an entertainment show that became popular among young audiences in Cameroon.

Through his work on Délire, he contributed to shaping youth culture and radio entertainment in Cameroon, using humor, commentary, and interactive segments to engage listeners.

He was also involved in broader media discussions and initiatives, including participation in forums on community radio development in Cameroon.

=== Cultural influence ===
Dirane was known for his outspoken style and influence within entertainment media. In interviews, he addressed social and cultural issues, sometimes generating controversy through his views expressed in public discourse.

His work contributed to the evolution of urban radio programming in Cameroon, particularly in engaging youth audiences through entertainment-focused broadcasting.

== Health and later life ==
In later years, reports emerged concerning Dirane's health, including claims related to Alzheimer's disease and family disputes regarding his care.

Family members later clarified publicly that he was receiving medical attention.

== Death ==
Foly Dirane died on 26 March 2026. His death was widely reported in Cameroonian media, with tributes highlighting his role as a pioneer of youth-oriented radio programming and his impact on entertainment broadcasting.

== Selected chronology ==
- 1990s — Emerged in Cameroonian radio broadcasting
- 2009-01-05 — Profiled for contributions to youth media
- 2012-03-20 — Public interview addressing cultural issues
- 2018-08-06 — Reports on health challenges emerge
- 2022-04-26 — Media retrospective on his career
- 2026-03-26 — Death announced in national media

== See also ==
- Media in Cameroon
- Radio broadcasting in Africa
