= Nol Alembong =

Cameroonian poet

- Born: Cameroon
- Citizenship: Cameroonian
- Education: University of Yaoundé I
- Occupations: Poet and scholar
- Notable work: Passing Winds; Forest Echoes
- Title: Professor of African Literature and Civilisations and current Dean of the Faculty of Arts at the University of Buea, Cameroon.

Nol Alembong is a Cameroonian poet, scholar and literary figure, whose works deeply reflect the intersection of African culture, identity and postcolonial themes. His poetry is known for its rich oral influences, nature metaphors and historical consciousness, making him a key voice in contemporary African literature. Through his writings, Alembong weaves stories that highlight imperialism, nostalgia, resilience and cultural pride, using language that resonates with both tradition and modernity.

== Biography ==
Alembong is a Cameroonian scholar, poet and prose writer. He has served as a professor of African literature at the University of Yaoundé I and is currently the vice chancellor of FOMIC Polytechnic University. He has held various academic positions, including dean of the Faculty of Arts at the University of Buea.

== Publications ==
=== Books ===
Sources:

- "Here, Where We Live", short story in Callaloo in 1980
- Forest Echoes (2012)
- Passing Winds (2013)
- Green Call (2017)

=== Articles ===
- "Matter and Manner: A Postcolonial Reading of Nol Alembong’s The Passing Wind" – Examines his poetry’s role in depicting postcolonial disillusionment.
- "Cross-Referencing Nature and Culture in Nol Alembong’s Forest Echoes" – Explores how he uses the forest as a metaphor for human relationships with nature.
- "The Interface of Oral Traditions and the Poetry of Nol Alembong" – Discusses how his poetry blends oral traditions with written literature

== Writing style ==
Alembong’s poetry is deeply rooted in oral traditions, incorporating legends, folktales, proverbs, riddles, and incantations. His themes often explore peace, war, nostalgia, revolt, hope, imperialism, and cultural identity. His dramatic techniques include cross-referencing nature and culture, using metaphors, and blending traditional African storytelling with modern poetic forms.

== See also ==
- Literature of Cameroon
