= Mauricio Donoso =

Chilean footballer (born 1976)

Personal information
- Full name: Mauricio Alejandro Donoso Pérez
- Date of birth: 30 April 1976 (age 50)
- Place of birth: Santiago, Chile
- Height: 1.71 m (5 ft 7 in)
- Position: Attacking midfielder

Youth career
- Cobreloa

Senior career*
Years	Team	Apps	(Gls)
1994–2000	Cobreloa	80	(11)
2000–2002	UNAM	36	(3)
2002–2003	Universidad de Chile	23	(5)
2003–2005	Colo-Colo	37	(4)
2005	Everton	17	(4)
2006–2007	Deportes Antofagasta	62	(16)
2008–2010	Deportivo Quito	47	(5)
2011	Deportes Iquique	22	(2)
2012–2013	Coquimbo Unido	24	(2)
Total		348	(52)

International career
1995	Chile U20	1	(0)
1999–2001	Chile	2	(0)
- * Club domestic league appearances and goals

Mauricio Alejandro Donoso Pérez (born 30 April 1976) is a Chilean former footballer.

He played as an attacking midfielder during his years active.

== Club career ==
He has performed at Cobreloa, Universidad de Chile, Colo-Colo, Everton, Antofagasta in Chile, and Pumas of UNAM in Mexico.

== International career ==
Donoso took part of the Chile U20 squad at the 1995 FIFA World Youth Championship and played a match. At senior level, he was involved in the Chile national team in 1999, and has represented his country twice.

== Personal life ==
His older brother, José Luis, was a Chile under-20 international footballer and took part of the squad at the 1988 South American U-20 Championship.

He holds Ecuadorian citizenship after having played in Ecuador.

== Honours ==
=== Clubs ===
Deportivo Quito

- Serie A (2): 2008, 2009
