= Swazi passport =

Passport of the Kingdom of Eswatini

Eswatini passport
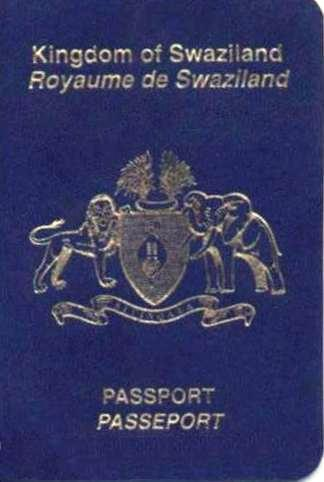
- Type: Passport
- Issued by: Eswatini
- Purpose: Identification
- Eligibility: Emaswati citizenship

Passports are issued to citizens of Eswatini to travel outside the country. In 2015, citizens had visa-free or visa on arrival access to 67 countries and territories, ranking the passport 73rd in the world, and 7th in Africa.

The Kingdom of Eswatini also has a Travel Document that is issued to Emaswati citizens who intend to visit countries within Southern African Development Community (SADC) Region with the exception of Angola. Although the Passport can also be used for SADC travel, it is most required for travel to other countries besides those within SADC Region.

== Biometric chip ==
On May 28, 2026, the Government of Eswatini and a Turkmenistani company Aýdyň Gijeler reached an agreement to produce 500,000 biometric passports for citizens of the Kingdom of Eswatini. The documents will be produced using the highly secure Austria Card chip platform and modern cryptographic and biometric technologies.

== See also ==
- Visa requirements for Swazi citizens
