= Lady Ngo Mang Epesse =

Lady Ngo Mang Epesse is a Cameroonian journalist, women's rights researcher and television producer based in France. She produced and presented the television programme called Lady vous écoute.

== Career ==
=== Television ===
Lady Ngo Mang Epesse produced and presented the Lady vous écoute a television programme focused on women right's.
