= Lucia Ediage =

Cameroonian public administrator

Lucia Ediage Sona
- Born: Cameroon
- Occupation: Public administrator
- Employer(s): Ministry of Women's Empowerment and the Family (MINPROFF)
- Known for: Women’s empowerment and gender advocacy in Cameroon
- Office: Regional Delegate for Women's Empowerment and the Family, South West Region

Lucia Ediage Sona is a Cameroonian public administrator serving as the Regional Delegate of the Ministry of Women's Empowerment and the Family (MINPROFF) for the South West Region of Cameroon. She is known for her involvement in initiatives promoting women's empowerment, digital inclusion, and the protection of girls’ rights in crisis-affected communities.

== Career ==
=== Regional Delegate for Women's Empowerment ===
Lucia Ediage Sona serves as the South West Regional Delegate of the Ministry of Women's Empowerment and the Family (MINPROFF), where she oversees programs aimed at improving the socio-economic conditions of women and families in the region.

Her role includes coordinating government policies on gender equality, supporting women's economic empowerment, and collaborating with national and international partners.

=== Digital inclusion initiatives ===
In August 2025, she participated in the inauguration of the Orange Digital Center “Maison Digitale” in Buea, an initiative aimed at enhancing digital literacy and economic empowerment among women and girls.

Speaking during the inauguration, Ediage Sona highlighted the importance of digital technologies in improving the visibility and economic participation of women's groups, noting that such initiatives align with national policies aimed at improving living conditions and fostering inclusion.

The initiative forms part of broader efforts to equip women with skills in information and communication technologies (ICT), financial management, and entrepreneurship.

=== Advocacy for girls’ rights ===
Ediage Sona has also played a role in advocacy initiatives addressing the challenges faced by girls in the South West Region, particularly in the context of the Anglophone crisis.

In June 2025, she participated in the launch of the “Girls’ Vision for the Future Movement” in Buea, an initiative led by UNICEF and partners to amplify girls’ voices and promote their rights.

During the event, she emphasized the severe impact of the ongoing crisis on girls, including displacement, exposure to violence, and limited access to education. She described the situation as “disheartening and deplorable,” while expressing optimism that the movement would empower girls to speak out against discrimination and gender-based violence.

She further noted that peer-led advocacy within communities could play a significant role in addressing gender inequality and promoting behavioral change among young people.

== Public engagement and impact ==
Through her work, Lucia Ediage Sona has contributed to strengthening partnerships between government institutions, international organizations, and local communities to advance gender equality and social inclusion in Cameroon.

Her involvement in both digital empowerment projects and rights-based advocacy reflects a multi-sectoral approach to addressing the challenges faced by women and girls in the South West Region.

== See also ==
- Ministry of Women's Empowerment and the Family (Cameroon)
- Gender equality in Cameroon
