= Tsi Conrad =

Photojournalist

Tsi Conrad is a Cameroonian activist, photojournalist writer, film maker and human rights defender born in 1987.

== Early life and career ==
Tsi Conrad was born in 1987, in Nterinkon Bamenda, in the North-West region of Cameroon. He founded Ruphina's House, a news agency and Film production company, in 2013 and also worked with Cejay Productions, a multimedia company. As a photojournalist, he documented rally demonstrations in Cameroon's English-speaking regions where he distributed photos and videos to media organizations and his social media handles.

== Arrest and Detention ==
According to the United Nations Working Group on Arbitrary Detention, Conrad experienced repeated harassment and detention from security forces in December 2016, while covering demonstrations in Bamenda. On the 8 of December 2016, he was arrested while filming a rally demonstrations and later interrogated regarding his journalistic work and his social media activities and later transferred to Yaoundé.

He was subsequently detained at Yaoundé Central Prison and prosecuted before the Yaoundé Military Court.

== Trial ==
On 25 May 2018, Conrad was convicted by the Yaoundé Military Court of several offences, including terrorism, secession, hostilities against the fatherland and propagation of false information. He was sentenced to 15 years imprisonment and ordered to pay damages amounting to 268 million CFA francs. His lawyers appealed the judgment.
