= Nathalie Etoké =

Cameroonian scholar, writer, filmmaker, and professor (born 1977)

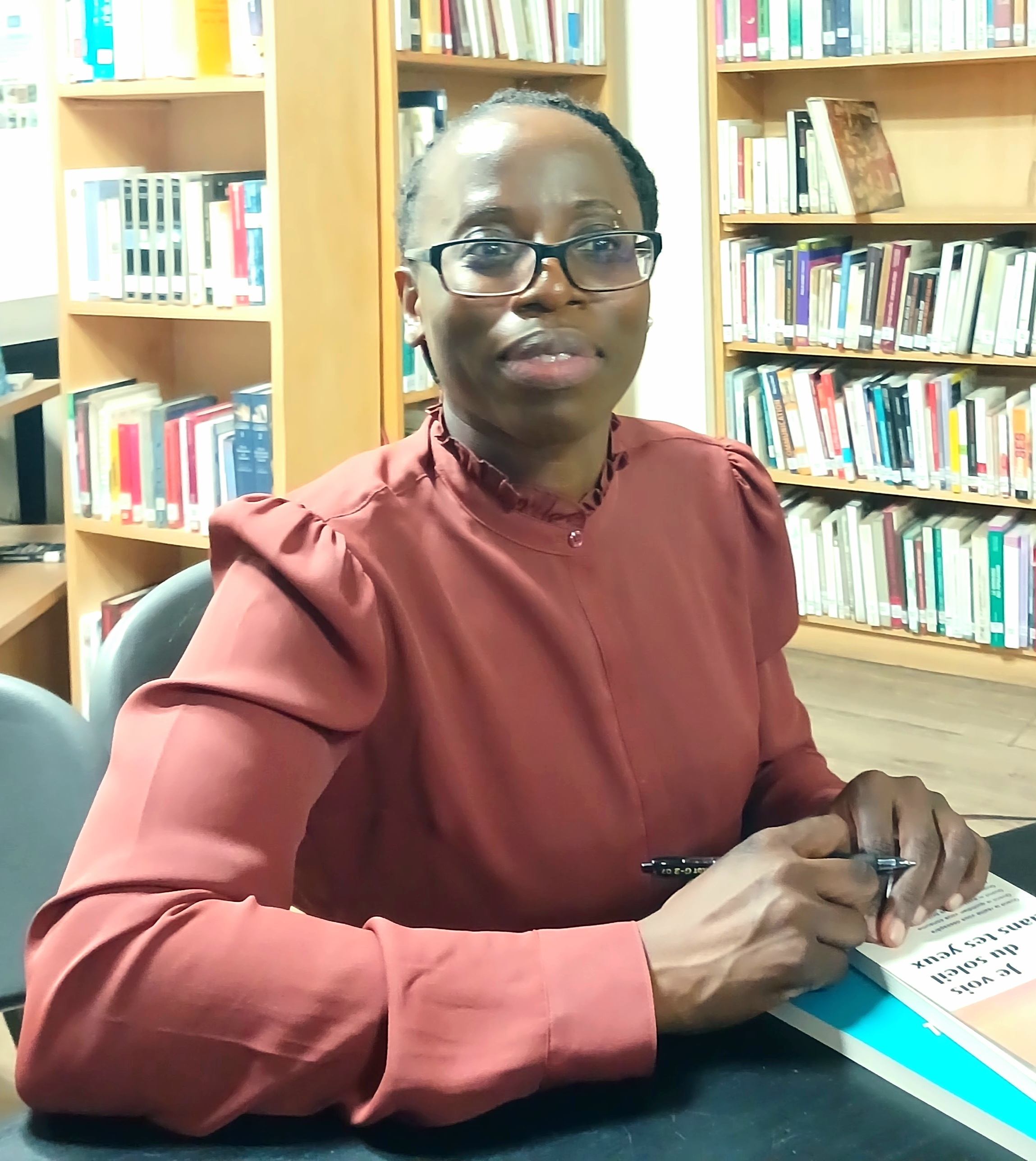
- Etoke in 2024
- Born: 20 June 1977 (age 49); Paris, France
- Occupations: Scholar, writer, filmmaker, and professor

Academic background
- Education: Northwestern University

Academic work
- Institutions: City University of New York

Nathalie Etoké (born 1977) is a Cameroonian scholar, writer, filmmaker, and professor specializing in Africana studies, Francophone African literature, Black existential thought, and cultural studies.

== Early life and education ==
Etoké was born in Paris, France on 20 June 1977. Her mother was a company lawyer in Douala; her father was a solicitor. The family moved to Cameroon in 1978. In 1995, Etoké returned to France, where she pursued a Masters degree in modern literature in Lille. In 2001, Etoké moved to the United States to pursue a Ph.D. at Northwestern University, graduating in 2006.

Her academic training includes studies at Cergy-Pontoise University and Charles de Gaulle University – Lille III.

== Academic career ==
Etoké previously worked as an assistant professor at Connecticut College. She currently works at the Graduate Center of the City University of New York, where she teaches courses in French, Africana studies, Black and ethnic studies, women's and gender studies, and liberal studies.

Her research focuses on Francophone Sub-Saharan African literature and cinema, Black French studies, queer studies in Africa and the African diaspora, and Africana existential philosophy.

Etoké has argued for a transnational understanding of Black identity shaped by slavery, colonialism, migration, and political struggle. In interviews and public lectures, she has discussed the relationship between Black existentialism and movements for social justice.

== Writing and scholarship ==
Etoké is the author of several books addressing race, memory, colonial violence, gender, and Black subjectivity.

Her 2010 book L'écriture du corps féminin dans la littérature de l'Afrique francophone au sud du Sahara analyzes representations of the female body in Francophone African literature.

The same year, she published Melancholia Africana: L'indispensable dépassement de la condition noire, a study of historical trauma and Black existence in the aftermath of slavery and colonialism.

Her 2021 book Shades of Black examines race and Black humanity in contemporary Western societies, drawing connections between colonial history, anti-Black racism, and modern political movements.

In Black Existential Freedom (2022), Etoké explored forms of Black agency and freedom beyond conventional political definitions, using philosophy, literature, film, and music as analytical frameworks.

== Film ==
In 2011, Etoké directed the documentary Afro Diasporic French Identities, which explores race, citizenship, and identity among Black communities in contemporary France.

== Awards and recognition ==
Etoké received the Frantz Fanon Prize from the Caribbean Philosophical Association for her work Melancholia Africana.

== Publications ==
=== Books ===
==== Fiction ====
- Un amour sans papiers (in French). Paris: Editions Cultures Croisées. 1999. ISBN 9782913059030. (novel)
- King, Adèle, ed. (2004). "Bessombè : Between Homeland and Exile". From Africa - New francophone stories. Lincoln: University of Nebraska Press. pp. 125–129. ISBN 9780803227583. (short story in English)
- Je vois du soleil dans tes yeux (in French). Yaoundé: Presses de l'Université catholique d'Afrique centrale. 2008. ISBN 978-2-84849-032-8. (novel)

==== Non-fiction ====
- L'écriture du corps féminin dans la littérature de l'Afrique francophone au sud du Sahara. Enseignement et éducation en Afrique (in French). Paris: l'Harmattan. 2010. ISBN 978-2-296-12443-1.
- Melancholia africana: l'indispensable dépassement de la condition noire. Mémoires du Sud (in French). Paris: Éd. du Cygne. 2010. ISBN 978-2-84924-198-1.
  - English translation: Melancholia Africana: The Indispensable Overcoming of the Black Condition. Translated by Bill Hamlett. Bloomsbury Academic. 2019. ISBN 978-1-78661-302-8.
- Shades of Black. Quilombola Ser. Translated by Gila Walker. Chicago: Seagull Books. 2021. ISBN 978-0-85742-853-0.
- Black Existential Freedom. Living existentialism. Lanham: Rowman & Littlefield. 2023. ISBN 978-1-5381-5708-4.
- Nuances du Noir (2023)

=== Articles ===
- Etoké, Nathalie (2017). ""COULEUR" et "COMMUNAUTÉ" de Léonora Miano: Du noir dans le bleu-blanc-rouge". Nouvelles Études Francophones. 32 (1): 27–42. ISSN 1552-3152. JSTOR 44684563.
- Etoke, Nathalie (2018). "Images de soi, discours sur soi et conscience de soi: Afro Diasporic French Identities (2011)". Nouvelles Études Francophones. 33 (1): 88–105. ISSN 1552-3152. JSTOR 26860303.
