= Marie-Thérèse Abena Ondoa =

Cameroonian politician, minister

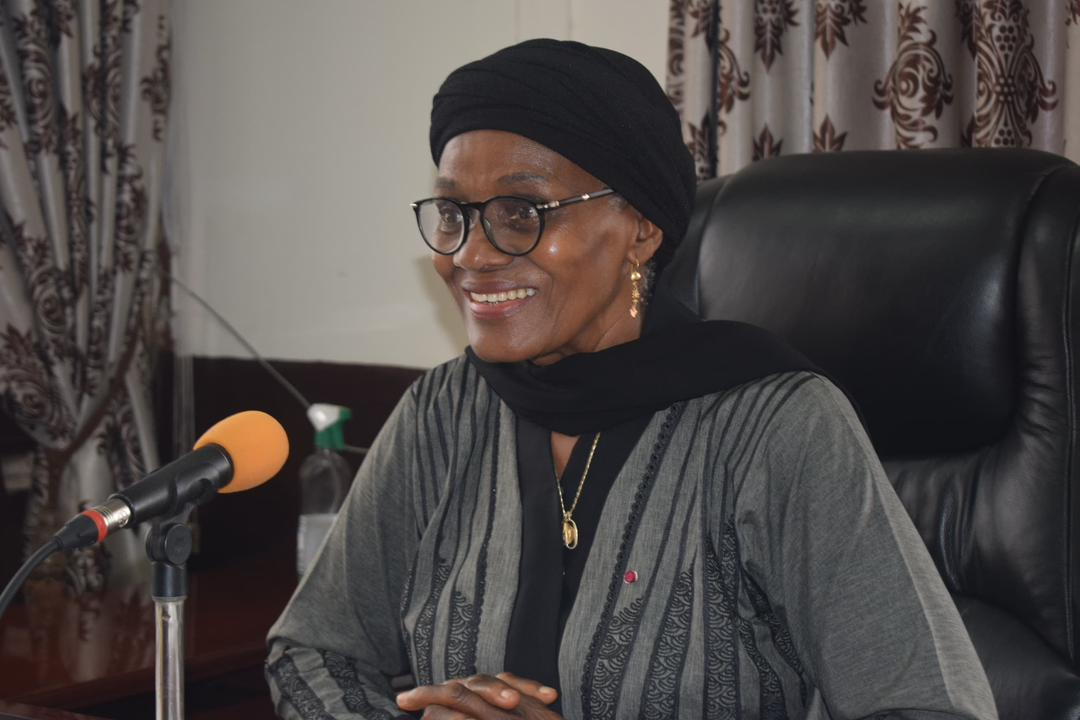
- Ondoa in 2025

Minister of Women Empowerment and The Family
- Incumbent
- Assumed office 30 June 2009
- Prime Minister: Philémon Yang; Joseph Ngute
- Preceded by: Suzanne Mbomback

Personal details
- Born: Marie-Thérèse Obama; 10 August 1942 (age 84) Douala (Cameroon)
- Party: CPDM
- Profession: Pediatrician

Marie-Thérèse Abena Ondoa (née Obama; born 10 August 1942 in Douala) is a Cameroonian academic and politician. She has been a Minister of Women's Empowerment and the Family since 2009. She was assistant dean in the Faculty of Medicine of the University of Yaounde before her appointment as Minister.

== Academic and medical activities ==
Ondoa was a professor of medicine at the University of Yaoundé, Vice-Dean of the faculty, in charge of research and cooperation; and head of the Pediatric Department of the University Teaching Hospital (CHU) of Yaoundé. She was appointed the director of the regional hospital of Yaoundé on March 17, 2009, becoming the first Cameroonian woman to hold this position.

== Politics ==
In 2009, four months after her appointment as head of the regional hospital in Yaounde, she was appointed Minister of Women's Empowerment and the Family, replacing Suzanne Mbomback who held this position from 2004.

She was reappointed to carry out these same functions during the cabinet reshuffle of October 2, 2015, in the cabinet of Philemon Yang. In 2016, she managed a budget of nearly 7 billion CFA francs (just over 10 million euros), a 21% increase from the previous year's amount.

On the third International Day of Children's Rights in 2016, she strongly opposed child marriage, which particularly affects girls by depriving them of education and deters their empowerment. She called on community and religious leaders, as well as journalists and heads of households, to fight against this practice and "other negative traditional practices." Before the commemoration of the 14th International day of the Rights of the Child on November 20, 2025, she cited the most tragic cases including the murder of an 11 years old Ndzie Karl Olivier Ethan, killed in his family home in the Minkan neighborhood in Yaounde months back. The crime occurred just days after the killing of a three year old girl in Manjo in the Littoral region. These case, she regretted, widely circulated on both traditional and social media, have sparked wide spread outrage. Prof Abena Ondoa , in the statement strongly condemns all forms of violence and violations of Children's rights, stressing that these acts under mind the fundamental right of everything child which is the right to Life. The minister equally urged parents and guardians to exercise maximum vigilance to protect children and prevent any recurrence of such tragedy.
