= Saint Lucian nationality law =

Saint Lucia Citizenship Act

Parliament of Saint Lucia
- Long title: An Act relating to Saint Lucian citizenship
- Enacted by: Government of Saint Lucia
- Status: Current legislation

Saint Lucian nationality law is regulated by the Saint Lucia Constitution Order of 1978, as amended; the Citizenship of Saint Lucia Act of 1979, and its revisions; and various British nationality laws. These laws determine who is, or is eligible to be, a national of Saint Lucia. Saint Lucian nationality is typically obtained either on the principle of jus soli, i.e. by birth in Saint Lucia; or under the rules of jus sanguinis, i.e. by birth abroad to parents with Saint Lucian nationality. It can be granted to persons with an affiliation to the country, or to a permanent resident who has lived in the country for a given period of time through naturalisation. There is also, currently a program in Saint Lucia for persons to acquire nationality through investment in the country. Nationality establishes one's international identity as a member of a sovereign nation. Though it is not synonymous with citizenship, for rights granted under domestic law for domestic purposes, the United Kingdom, and thus the Commonwealth, have traditionally used the words interchangeably.

== Acquiring Saint Lucian nationality ==
Saint Lucian nationality is acquired through birth, registration, or naturalisation.

=== By birth ===
- Persons who are born within the territory, except if the parent has diplomatic immunity or is a national of a country at war with Saint Lucia;
- Persons who are born abroad to at least one parent who was born in Saint Lucia; or
- Persons born upon aircraft or ships registered in Saint Lucia or unregistered aircraft or ships belonging to the government.

=== By registration ===
Nationality by registration includes those who have familial or historic relationship affiliations with Saint Lucia. It also includes a scheme to acquire nationality through investment. Persons who acquire nationality by registration include:

==== By affiliation ====
- The spouse of a national of Saint Lucia;
- Commonwealth citizens who are ordinary residents of Saint Lucia who have resided in the territory for seven years;
- Minor persons who were born to a Saint Lucian parent who would have acquired such nationality had their parent not died prior to independence;
- Minors under age twenty-one who are legally adopted by a national; or
- Any minor, at the discretion of the Minister.

==== By investment ====
Requirements for acquiring nationality through investment in Saint Lucia include payment of fees, which in 2015 were US$50,000 for the main applicant, US$35,000 for each dependent over age eighteen, and US$25,000 for each dependent under age eighteen. The primary applicant must be 18 years of age or older and must make a minimum investment, which increases if there are dependents, in the Saint Lucia National Economic Fund, in an approved real estate purchase, or through the purchase of Government bonds. Agents of the Citizenship by Investment Unit are responsible for processing applications. Applicants must pay non-refundable due diligence fees for background checks and provide other documentation, such as medical reports, identity documents, and a police report, as required.

=== By naturalisation ===
Ordinary naturalisation in Saint Lucia can be obtained by non-Commonwealth adult persons of legal capacity, who in the 12 months prior to submitting an application resided in the territory, are of good character, and intend to be a resident of Saint Lucia. Applicants petition the Minister responsible for immigration, who considers whether the applicant has adequate knowledge of the English language; and has resided within the territory, worked for the government, or has combined residency and government service for seven years. Upon approval, applicants must take an Oath of Allegiance and, unless they are a citizen of the Republic of Ireland, renounce their citizenship of origin.

== Loss of nationality ==
Nationals may voluntarily renounce their affiliation with Saint Lucia, if the declarant is a legal adult and of full capacity. Renunciation may not be accepted if Saint Lucia is in a war with the proposed new source of nationality. Denaturalisation may occur if a person obtained nationality through fraud, false representation, or concealment; if they have committed acts of treason; if they have committed acts of disloyalty or service to a foreign government; or in the case of nationality by investment for dependents if the application was fraudulent.

== Dual nationality ==
Since independence, Saint Lucia has allowed dual nationality for all citizens other than by ordinary naturalisation. Citizens by ordinary naturalisation may have multiple citizenship if they were a citizen of the Republic of Ireland at the time of their naturalisation.

== History ==
=== Spanish and French period (1502–1814) ===
The early history of Saint Lucia is unclear. It is known that it was inhabited by Arawak people and later by the Kalinago people, also known as Island Caribs. The first European to encounter the island was probably Juan de la Cosa, Christopher Columbus' navigator, who landed on the island in either 1499 or 1504. A map drawn by de la Cosa from 1500 indicates an island, designated as El Falcon, which appears to be Saint Lucia. Other sources credit the first sighting of the island to Columbus in 1498 or 1502, during his fourth expedition to the Americas, though he made no official mention of the island. Still others credit Alonso de Ojeda with the discovery of Saint Lucia on his 1499 voyage. A 1511 royal decree claimed Saint Lucia as part of the Spanish realm. Despite attempts to enslave the Kalinago people they encountered in the Lesser Antilles, the native inhabitants' resistance resulted in little attempt by Spain to establish settlements on these islands. Primarily the islands of the Lesser Antilles were used as waystations to replenish food, water, and wood supplies for Dutch, English, French, and Spanish sailors. French pirate François le Clerc may have established a raiding base at Pigeon Island in 1553. The Dutch established a settlement at Vieux Fort around 1600, which failed and then in 1605 British colonists headed for The Guianas were blown of course and attempted to settle. Within a month, their numbers had dwindled from sixty-seven to nineteen and they fled the island heading to Venezuela. In 1626, the Compagnie de Saint-Christophe was chartered by Louis XIII's chief minister, Cardinal Richelieu to colonise the Lesser Antilles, between the eleventh and eighteenth parallels. In 1627 a royal patent was issued by Charles I of England to James Hay, 1st Earl of Carlisle granting rights over the Caribbean islands situated between 10° and 20° north latitude, creating a competing claim.

In 1635, the Compagnie de Saint-Christophe was reorganised under a new patent for the Compagnie des Îles de l'Amérique with the authority to take over all the properties and administration of the former company and continue colonising neighbouring vacant islands. Another failed British colonisation attempt was made in 1639; this time by Thomas Warner who had settled Saint Kitts. In 1642, Richelieu recommended that the king extend the charter for twenty years, which was agreed with the proviso that the crown retained title to any island not settled at the end of that period. In 1643, Jacques Dyel du Parquet, Governor of Martinique, discovered that Sainte-Lucie, also shown as Sainte-Alouzie, was abandoned by the English and proposed that Louis de Kerengoan, Sieur de Rousselan, lead an expedition to colonise there. De Rousselan was married to a Kalinago woman and it was hoped that might prove advantageous for establishing a settlement. He arrived in June 1650, with around 40 colonists and established a fort at the mouth of the Rivière du Carenage, near present-day Castries. The colonisation company was facing bankruptcy and in September 1650, du Parquet purchased the proprietorship for Grenada, the Grenadines, Martinique and Sanite-Lucie for 41,500 Francs. In granting him the proprietorship, the king appointed him the Governor-General of the islands, making him the crown's representative of the government. By the time of de Rousselan's death, four years later, the colony on Sainte-Lucie was thriving.

From the establishment of a successful colony, over the next century and a half, Sainte-Lucie remained almost exclusively under French administration, though it was captured by the British and returned to the French over a dozen times. In 1667, after signing the Treaty of Breda, which ended the Second Anglo-Dutch War, the colony was transferred to the administration of the French West India Company. When that company was dissolved in 1674, Louis XIV made it a crown colony, as a dependency of Martinique. As colonisation spread throughout the island, settlers brought in slaves to work the coffee and cocoa farms they had established. In France, the precursor to nationality, which evolved during the Ancien Régime, was a system of feudal allegiance in which subjects were bound together by a scheme of protection and service tied to land ownership. Possession of land was typically tied to military and court service and omitted women because they could not perform those obligations. Thus, French nationality also derived from place of birth in French territory, until the nineteenth century, but under feudal law married women were subjugated to the authority of their husbands under coverture. The French Empire created separate codes for the colonies and the motherland, resulting in little global standardisation of French law.

Numerous colonial laws issued from 1550 governed the French Antilles until the Code Noir was decreed by Louis XIV in 1685. The Code was designed to control the social relations between black and white people in the Caribbean and contained provisions for naturalisation of freed persons. Producing illegitimate children with slaves carried heavy penalties; however, marrying a slave woman in a church automatically manumitted her and any offspring the marriage. Children followed the status of the mother, regardless of the father's status, thus if she was a slave her children were slaves and if she was free her children were free. The abolition of slavery in 1794 granted French nationality to all men in the French colonies, but the reestablishment of slavery in 1802, made the status of colonial subjects confusing. In 1805, the Napoleonic Civil Code was extended to the French Antilles, but the capture of Sainte-Lucie in 1803, during the Napoleonic Wars, meant that the law in force in the colony at the time of its capitulation was the Coutume de Paris. Under the terms of the 1814 Treaty of Paris the territory was granted to Britain.

=== British colony (1814–1979) ===
In Britain, allegiance, in which subjects pledged to support a monarch, was the precursor to the modern concept of nationality. The Crown recognised from 1350 that all persons born within the territories of the British Empire were subjects. Those born outside the realm — except children of those serving in an official post abroad, children of the monarch, and children born on a British sailing vessel — were considered by common law to be foreigners. Marriage did not affect the status of a subject of the realm. Other than common law, there was no standard statutory law which applied for subjects throughout the realm, meaning different jurisdictions created their own legislation for local conditions, which often conflicted with the laws in other jurisdictions in the empire. For example, British laws of conquest held that when a territory was acquired by being conquered or ceded, the existing laws remained in place. An ordinance issued in 1817, by the Governor of Saint Lucia, Richard Augustus Seymour, confirmed that the customs, laws, and regulations of France remained in place. This created confusion for British administrators who had to interpret the unfamiliar language and laws, as well as conflict with the French judiciary and British governors.

In 1819, the Governor, John Keane, 1st Baron Keane, approached legal advisors and requested that they examine whether the Code de la Martinique could be adopted for Saint Lucia. The legal advisors refused to cooperate or even make the laws that were in force in Saint Lucia available, claiming they had been lost in a fire. By 1830, the only British laws which had been extended to the territory were the Slave Trade Act 1807 (47 Geo. 3 Sess. 1. c. 36), barring the Atlantic slave trade in the empire; the West Indian and American Trade Act 1822 (3 Geo. 4. c. 44), which controlled trade between the Caribbean and the United States; the Factors Act 1823 (4 Geo. 4. c. 83), as amended in 1825, which regulated the exchange of goods and the security liens which capitalised those transactions; and the Customs Act 1823 (4 Geo. 4. c. 2), amended in 1824 and 1826, which regulated the tariffs and duties of various commodities. In 1831, through an Order in Council the Colonial Office changed the court system and brought under consideration the use of English in oral pleadings. These changes were strongly objected to by the planters, who submitted a petition to the governor complaining about the changes. By 1833 only judges trained in English law were appointed to the bench, but pleadings were still conducted in French and per a compromise reached French would be allowed until 1840, when English would become mandatory.

The Slave Trade Act 1807 had not abolished slavery, which did not end until the Slavery Abolition Act 1833 went into effect in 1834. Under its terms, slaves were converted into apprentices and remained bound to their former owners for four years if they had worked in the home and for six years if they had been field labourers. To further delay the change to English in Saint Lucia, the argument was used by jurists that the language shift should not occur until after the apprenticeship period ended to give former slaves adequate time to learn the new official tongue, thus laws continued to be made in both languages for many years. In 1838, the apprenticeship system ended, as British officials felt difficulties would arise from the differing schedules for freedom. Though free, there was never a British plan to give former slaves a voice in Parliament, leaving them as British subjects in a highly stratified system of rights. Denied political and economic rights, former slaves were not entitled to formal recognition as nationals by other nations. In 1838, Saint Lucia was incorporated into the British Windward Islands colony, which was administered by the Governor of Barbados. In 1845, Arthur Wellesley Torrens, Lieutenant-Governor of Saint Lucia proposed that the laws for the territory be compiled. He stressed that English copies of the Coutume de Paris, Code de la Martinique, and British laws should each form part of the compilation. The compilation had not been completed in 1848, when Charles Henry Darling replaced Torrens as Lieutenant-Governor and he personally took on the task of completing it. In 1851, Darling sent his compilation to William Colebrooke, Governor-General of the Windward Colony, which was approved by the Legislative Council, and in 1853 the collected laws of Saint Lucia were first published.

In 1869, William Des Vœux, colonial administrator, and James Sherrard Armstrong, who would become the Chief Justice of Saint Lucia in 1871, launched a project to provide a Civil Code and a Code of Civil Procedure for the territory. They used as a model the codes of Quebec, but rather than translations, they created an English version which eliminated some of the influences of the Roman Catholic Church, found in the original French. They completed their work in 1875, and over objections from the clergy, the Ordinance approving it passed the following year and subsequently went in to force on 20 October 1879. The Code legally incapacitated married women and rendered marriages indissoluble prior to the death of one of the spouses, except in a limited scope available for annulment if the marriage had been falsely contracted, entered into without consent, or was within prohibited degrees of consanguinity. It stipulated that foreign women acquired the nationality of their spouse upon marriage. The Code also required that married women have the same domicile as their spouse, which unlike English law equated establishing a domicile with establishing a permanent jurisdiction of rights. (Note: British law makes a distinction between domicile of origin and permanent residence, recognising that a person can permanently live in a place other than where they were born without giving up their nationality. Domicile in France is tied to the place from which one derives their civil rights.)

In 1911, at the Imperial Conference a decision was made to draft a common nationality code for use across the empire. The British Nationality and Status of Aliens Act 1914 allowed local jurisdictions in the self-governing Dominions to continue regulating nationality in their territories, but also established an imperial nationality scheme throughout the realm. The uniform law, which went into effect on 1 January 1915, required a married woman to derive her nationality from her spouse, meaning if he was British, she was also, and if he was foreign, so was she. It stipulated that upon loss of nationality of a husband, a wife could declare that she wished to remain British and provided that if a marriage had terminated, through death or divorce, a British-born national who had lost her status through marriage could reacquire British nationality through naturalisation without meeting a residency requirement. The statute reiterated common law provisions for natural-born persons born within the realm on or after the effective date. By using the word person, the statute nullified legitimacy requirements for jus soli nationals. For those born abroad on or after the effective date, legitimacy was still required, and could only be derived by a child from a British father (one generation), who was natural-born or naturalised. Naturalisations required five years residence or service to the crown.

Amendments to the British Nationality Act were enacted in 1918, 1922, 1933 and 1943 changing derivative nationality by descent and modifying slightly provisions for women to lose their nationality upon marriage. Because of a rise in statelessness, a woman who did not automatically acquire her husband's nationality upon marriage or upon his naturalisation in another country, did not lose their British status after 1933. The 1943 revision allowed a child born abroad at any time to be a British national by descent if the Secretary of State agreed to register the birth. Under the terms of the British Nationality Act 1948 British nationals in Saint Lucia were reclassified at that time as "Citizens of the UK and Colonies" (CUKC). The basic British nationality scheme did not change overmuch, and typically those who were previously defined as British remained the same. Changes included that wives and children no longer automatically acquired the status of the husband or father, children who acquired nationality by descent no longer were required to make a retention declaration, and registrations for children born abroad were extended. In 1957, Saint Lucia revised its Civil Code to incorporate aspects of British common law which were deemed necessary for the territory to join in a federal structure with other colonies. Specifically they repealed, among other items, Chapter 1, Section 17, which required wives to have the same nationality as a spouse.

In 1958, Saint Lucia joined the West Indies Federation. The federation, which included Barbados, the British Leeward Islands, the British Windward Islands, Jamaica, and Trinidad and Tobago, was typically seen by its supporters as a means to use a federal structure to gain national independence and eventual recognition as a Dominion. The federation was unable to develop a unified nationality scheme, as member states tended to identify with their specific island, rather than by region. The federation collapsed in 1962, but in 1967, Saint Lucia became an Associated State, under the West Indies Act 1967. The terms of the act provided that Associated States – Antigua, Dominica, Grenada, Saint Christopher-Nevis-Anguilla, Saint Lucia and Saint Vincent – were on a trajectory to become fully independent and could terminate their association upon becoming an independent Commonwealth country. Saint Lucia terminated Associated State status and became fully independent in 1979.

=== Post-independence (1979–present) ===
Saint Lucia became independent on 22 February 1979. Generally, persons who had previously been nationals as defined under the classification of "Citizens of the UK and Colonies", would become nationals of Saint Lucia on Independence Day and cease to be British nationals. Exceptions were made for persons to retain their British nationality and status if they (or their father or grandfather) were born, naturalised, or registered in a part of the realm which remained on 22 February part of the United Kingdom or colonies, or had been annexed by such a place. Other exceptions included that married women who had been registered as CUKCs would not lose their British status, unless their husbands did. Rather than granting married women the right to register, or widows who but for the death of the husband would have been eligible to register, Saint Lucia granted them nationality in their own right at independence and allowed CUKCs with a maternal connection to derive nationality from their mothers. The country also granted nationality on independence day to persons who were Commonwealth citizens, who had ordinarily lived in the territory for a minimum of seven years before independence and who held Saint Lucian British Passport and allowed husbands to register as citizens based on their wife's nationality. Subsequently, to the Independence Order, Saint Lucia enacted the Citizenship of Saint Lucia Act in 1979 to supplement provisions of the constitution.
