= Visa policy of Eswatini =

Policy on permits required to enter Eswatini

Visitors to Eswatini must obtain a visa from a diplomatic mission unless they are citizens of one of the eligible visa-exempt countries.

== Visa policy map ==
Visa policy of Eswatini Eswatini Visa not required (90 days) Visa not required (30 days) Visa required

== Visa exemption ==
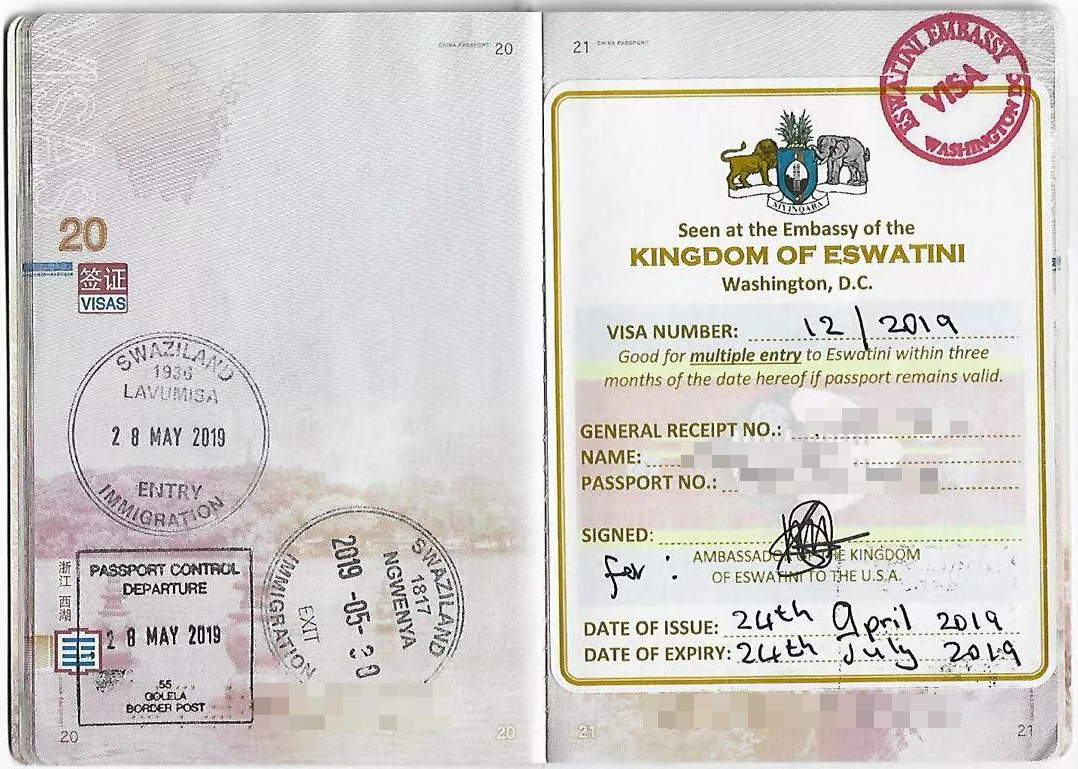
A 3-month multiple-entry visa issued to a Chinese citizen in 2019 by the Embassy of Eswatini in the United States.

Citizens of the following countries may enter Eswatini without a visa for the following period:

90 days

- Taiwan

30 days

- All European Union member states

- Andorra
- Antigua and Barbuda
- Argentina
- Australia
- Azerbaijan
- Bahamas
- Barbados
- Belize
- Bosnia and Herzegovina
- Botswana
- Brazil
- Brunei
- Canada
- Chile
- Dominica
- East Timor
- Gambia
- Ghana
- Grenada
- Guyana
- Israel
- Jamaica
- Japan
- Kenya
- Kuwait
- Lesotho
- Liechtenstein
- Madagascar
- Malawi
- Malaysia
- Maldives
- Mauritius
- Monaco
- Montenegro
- Mozambique
- Namibia
- Nauru
- New Zealand
- Norway
- Palestine
- Papua New Guinea
- Qatar
- Russia
- Saint Lucia
- Samoa
- San Marino
- Serbia
- Seychelles
- Sierra Leone
- Singapore
- Solomon Islands
- South Africa
- South Korea
- Switzerland
- Tanzania
- Tonga
- Trinidad and Tobago
- Turkey
- Tuvalu
- Uganda
- Ukraine
- United Arab Emirates
- United Kingdom
- United States
- Uruguay
- Vanuatu
- Vatican City
- Zambia
- Zimbabwe

Date of visa changes
- 29 July 1970: Israel
- 1 September 1970: Belgium, Luxembourg and Netherlands
- 12 June 2007: Russia
- 24 December 2020: Saint Kitts and Nevis

Cancelled:

- Unknown: Saint Kitts and Nevis (was applied on 24 December 2020)

Eswatini signed visa exemption agreements for diplomatic and service passports with Rwanda in August 2024 and with Indonesia in September 2024 and they are yet to be ratified.

== Visitor statistics ==
Most visitors arriving to Eswatini were from the following countries of nationality:

Country	2016	2015	2014
South Africa	814,220	810,249	856,492
Mozambique	202,042	181,271	219,555
Zimbabwe	49,295	69,467	58,624
Germany	22,895	21,510	21,669
France	21,253	19,360	14,152
Netherlands	20,750	17,414	17,874
United States	18,014	17,988	17,359
United Kingdom	15,503	14,646	15,813
Pakistan	7,450	5,216	4,242
India	6,867	5,145	5,031
Portugal	6,610	6,047	6,720
Botswana	5,969	5,833	5,913
Lesotho	5,682	5,092	5,554
Tanzania	5,659	6,311	5,718
Total	1,278,587	1,255,901	1,324,621

== See also ==
- Visa requirements for Swazi citizens
- Foreign relations of Eswatini
