= Panamanian nationality law =

Panamanian nationality law is regulated by the 1972 Constitution, as amended by legislative acts; the Civil Code; migration statues, such as Law Decree No. 3 (Spanish: Decreto Ley No. 3) of 2008; and relevant treaties to which Panama is a signatory. These laws determine who is, or is eligible to be, a citizen of Panama. The legal means to acquire nationality and formal membership in a nation differ from the relationship of rights and obligations between a national and the nation, known as citizenship. Panamanian nationality is typically obtained either on the principle of jus soli, i.e. by birth in Panama; or under the rules of jus sanguinis, i.e. by birth abroad to a parent with Panamanian nationality. It can also be granted to a permanent resident who has lived in the country for a given period of time through naturalization.

== Acquiring Panamanian nationality ==
Panamanian nationality can be acquired by birth, through naturalization, or by special disposition.

=== By birthright ===
Birthright nationals are specified as:

- Persons born within the territory of Panama;
- Persons born abroad, who have established residency in the country and for whom at least one parent was a birthright national; or
- Persons for whom one parent is a naturalized Panamanian and who have established residency in the country and expressed a desire to be Panamanian within a year of reaching their majority.

=== By naturalization ===
Naturalization is open to those adult foreigners who desire to naturalize, are willing to renounce other nationality, and have a basic knowledge of Spanish language and Panamanian geography, history and political organization. Applicants for naturalization must pay necessary fees and provide a request to the President of Panama along with documentation providing for identification and migration status, certification from the authorities of no criminal record, evidence of financial self-sufficiency, certifications regarding tax obligations and adequate health, and test results from the Election Tribunal for language and knowledge of Panama. Documentation and the petition are reviewed by the Ministry and National Migration Service. If the applicant is successful, the file is sent to the President to grants naturalization. Those who are eligible include:

- Persons who have continuously resided in Panama for a period of five years;
- Persons who have Panamanian children or have married a Panamanian national, after establishing a three-year residency in the territory; or
- Nationals of Spain or Latin American states, who have established residence in the country.

The residency must be permanent; years spent in the country under other types of residencies, such as temporary or for humanitarian reasons, are not valid for the purpose of naturalization.

=== By special dispensation ===
Foreign-born children under age seven, who have been adopted by a Panamanian national acquire Panamanian nationality by special dispensation upon completion of the adoption process with the recordation in the Civil Registry. Prior to 2004, adoptees were required to establish a domicile in Panama and request nationality upon reaching the age of majority.

== Loss of Panamanian nationality ==
Birthright nationals of Panama cannot lose their nationality or renounce it. Naturalized Panamanians can lose their nationality by renunciation, obtaining another nationality, or by serving an enemy nation.

== Dual nationality ==
Indigenous populations may have difficulty with the regulation processes for nationality and in the past have not had their nationality recognized. In 1996, Panama initiated a program for the Committee on the Elimination of Racial Discrimination to ensure that indigenous persons' dual nationality is recognized. Birthright Panamanians may acquire other nationalities by complying with regulations in the other country's laws. Naturalized Panamanians are not permitted to have multiple nationalities.

== History ==
Panama gained independence from Spain in 1821 and became one of the departments of the federal Republic of Gran Colombia. The Colombian Constitution of 1821, defined nationals as free persons, born in the territory and their descendants, residents of the country who were had supported independence, and naturalized foreigners. When Gran Colombia was partitioned into the Republic of New Granada, Ecuador, and Venezuela in 1832, the new constitution granted birthright nationality to those born in the territory or descended of nationals of the territory. Children born in New Grenada to foreigners or children born abroad to New Grenadian nationals, or former Gran Colombian nationals, were entitled to derived nationality if they were domiciled in the federal territory. The 1832 Constitution also granted nationality to freedmen and the children of slave women. Though there were various separatist movements (1826, 1830, 1831, 1840, and 1860), the nationality laws of Panama were mirrors of those of Colombia. During one of those conflicts, the first constitution for the State of the Isthmus, was drafted in 1841. It defined birthright Panamanians as those born in the territory or born outside the territory to Isthmian parents who were abroad in government service or to further the cause of independence. It allowed naturalization to those residing in the Isthmus at its independence or those born in any part of Gran Colombia or the Republic of New Granada who expressed the desire to be a native of the Isthmus. Two years later the Colombian Constitution was amended and contained provisions for foreign women to derive naturalization upon marriage with New Granadians.

Between 1853 and 1886, states within New Granada, and later the Granadine Confederation (1858–1863) and United States of Colombia (1863–1886), had the authority to adopt their own constitutions and civil codes. In that regard, Justo Arosemena led an unsuccessful effort for the adoption of a Civil Code in 1853, but was successful in his push for the creation of the Federal State of Panama in 1855. In 1862, the State of Panama adopted a modified version of the Chilean Civil Code drafted by Andrés Bello and then subsequently modified its constitution in 1863, 1865, 1868, 1870, 1873 and 1875. Under the Bello Code, married women were incapacitated by extending the husband's marital authority legally over his wife's person and property and requiring wives to maintain the same domicilio (permanent residence) as their husband. In 1886, the country was reorganized as the Republic of Colombia, state codes were abolished, and a new national constitution and Civil Code was drafted for the entire nation. The Colombian Constitution of 1886 defined three types of nationals: those born in the country, those born abroad to native-born parents or those born in Latin America who wanted Colombian nationality, and foreigners who were naturalized. The Republic adopted the Bello code for all of its territories in 1887 and this civil code remained in effect for Panama until 1916. The Naturalization Law (Ley 145) of 1888 gave men married to Colombian women a reduction from four years residency to two years for naturalization and stated in Article 17 that wives and children under age 21 derived their nationality from their husband or father. (Note: The cases of Reyes Gnecco de Dugand (24 March 1888) and Emma Hulsman (1923) were heard by the Ministry of Foreign Affairs, and negated the requirement for married women to lose their nationality. As Panamanian independence in 1903 preceded the second ruling, there were ambiguities remaining in Panamanian law concerning married women's nationality.)

In 1903, Panama declared its independence from Colombia and in 1904 adopted a new constitution. The constitution provided that Panamanians were those born in Panamanian territory, children born abroad to one Panamanian parent who upon reaching majority chose to be Panamanian, or Colombian nationals who had supported Panamanian independence. It allowed foreigners to naturalize, who were skilled in art, business, or science who had resided in the territory for ten years; who were married and had family residing in the territory after six years; and who were married to Panamanian women, after three years. Though a revision of the civil code was commissioned in 1904, it did not reach fruition. That year, the National Assembly adopted Law No. 6, which prohibited the immigration by Chinese, Syrian, or Turkish nationals to Panama. A new civil code commission was established in 1913 and in 1917 a new code was adopted. While it eliminated a husband's marital authority and secularized marriage, the question of married women's and minor children's nationality was not resolved. A commission was appointed in 1918 to resolve contradictions in the law, for example those articles pertaining to uncertain nationality and differences in the treatment of legitimate and illegitimate children.

Continuing the trend to restrict immigration to Europeans, in 1926, the Assembly passed Law 13 barring Afro-Caribbean, Chinese, Davidian, Guyanese, Indo-Aryan, Indo-Oriental, Japanese, Syrian, and Turkish nationals, unless their first language was Spanish. As workforce needs changed, the law was changed in 1928 through Law 6, which limited immigration of blacks, Chinese, Syrian, and Turkish nationals to ten per year. The law provided an exception for foreigners who had married Panamanian women prior to 1926. In 1927 and 1928 Acts were passed amending the constitution, clarifying that anyone born in Panama prior to October 1928 regardless of their parent's nationality was Panamanian. To have birthright nationality, those born after October 1928 had to be legitimate or legitimized and at least one parent had to be a Panamanian national. Children of foreign nationals born in Panama could choose Panamanian nationality upon reaching majority by declaring their intent to the proper authorities. Children born abroad to at least one parent who was Panamanian, had to establish residency in Panama before electing Panamanian nationality in the prescribed manner. In essence, the 1928 amendment left children born in Panama from 1928 forward to first generation immigrants without a nationality at birth. They were essentially stateless until they became adults and chose a nationality. In 1930 a naturalization law (Ley 26) was passed, which provided in article 10 that if a foreigner naturalized in Panama his wife and his minor children automatically derived his new citizenship. A married woman could not independently naturalize or relinquish her nationality.

In 1933, the exclusion act was updated to include Lebanese and Palestinian nationals whose first language was not Spanish. That year, Juan Demóstenes Arosemena, Eduardo E. Holguín, and Magín Pons, the Panamanian delegates to the Pan-American Union's Montevideo conference, signed the Inter-American Convention on the Nationality of Women, which became effective in 1934, without legal reservations. A new constitution was written in 1941, which incorporated ethnic restrictions to nationality. Birthright nationals were children born in the territory or abroad to at least one birthright parent, as long as the other parent was not of a prohibited class or children born to foreigners in the territory whose parents were not barred from immigration. It acknowledged that those born prior to independence and those previously naturalized before 1941 retained their nationality. But, it stripped nationality from any Panamanian of a prohibited ethnicity of their Panamanian nationality unless they had been in the country at the time of independence or had been born before 1928 in Panamanian territory. Provisions removed the requirement for married women to automatically derive their husband's nationality and allowed women to repatriate if they had previously lost their nationality upon dissolution of the marriage. Foundlings were allowed to acquire Panamanian nationality if that was the nationality held by their guardians. Foreigners who had participated in the independence movement, or who were not of the prohibited classes could naturalize after five years, after three years if they had children born in Panama, and after two years if they were married to a Panamanian. Retroactively, former nationals who had been born in the Canal Zone lost their Panamanian nationality.

In 1945 the constitution was suspended and a new constitutional convention was called to deal with inconsistencies between the exclusion policy and Article 21 of the constitution which provided that both Panamanians and foreigners were to be equal before the law without prejudice or privilege based upon birth, class, ethnicity, or political or religious belief. The Constitution of 1946 basically kept the same descriptions of who could be classed as native born or naturalized, but eliminated racial exclusion provisions. While the constitution listed acquisition of another nationality as grounds for loss of Panamanian nationality, it did contain a new provision for Spanish citizens or other independent American countries to nationalize under reciprocity agreements. Those born in Panamanian territory, but within the US jurisdiction of the Canal Zone were defined as nationals of the United States until 1 October 1979, when US administration ended and the area became jointly managed by both countries.
