= Emaswati nationality law =

Swaziland Citizenship Act

Parliament of Eswatini
- Enacted by: Government of Eswatini
- Status: Current legislation

Eswatini nationality law is regulated by the Constitution of Eswatini, as amended; the Swaziland Citizenship Act, and its revisions; and various international agreements to which the country is a signatory. These laws determine who is, or is eligible to be, a national of Eswatini. The legal means to acquire nationality, formal legal membership in a nation, differ from the domestic relationship of rights and obligations between a national and the nation, known as citizenship. Nationality describes the relationship of an individual to the state under international law, whereas citizenship is the domestic relationship of an individual within the nation. Eswatini nationality is typically obtained under the principle of jus soli, i.e. by birth in Eswatini, or jus sanguinis, born to parents with Eswatini nationality. It can be granted to persons with an affiliation to the country, or to a permanent resident who has lived in the country for a given period of time through naturalisation or the traditional khonta system.

== Acquisition of nationality ==
Nationality can be acquired in Eswatini at birth or later in life through naturalisation or tradition.

=== By birth ===
Those who acquire nationality at birth include:

- Children born in Eswatini, or aboard an aircraft or ship registered in or belonging to the Government of Eswatini, whose father is a Liswati, or would have been except for his death; or
- Illegitimate children born anywhere prior to 2005 whose mother is a Liswati can automatically derive nationality maternally, if the father is unknown, refuses to claim or adopt the child, or is stateless. (Note: To take advantage of this provision, a mother is required to prove that the father has not claimed the child under traditional custom or law.)
- Children born abroad can derive nationality from a father who is a native Liswati, but subsequent generations cannot derive Eswatini nationality; or
- Abandoned children or orphans up to the age of seven discovered in the territory whose parents are unknown.

=== By naturalisation ===
Naturalisation can be granted to persons who have resided in the territory for a sufficient period of time to confirm they understand either English or siSwati, as well as are accepted as a Liswati by the customs and traditions of the society. General provisions are that applicants have good character; can economically be self-sufficient; and can contribute to development of the nation. Support by a chief, who has consulted with the chief's council, or three reputable citizens are required for an applicant to be approved for registration. Naturalised persons are required to swear an oath of allegiance before receiving their certification. Minor children are not able to be included in a naturalisation petition. Typically a residency period of five years is required. Persons who are not ethnically Emaswati have difficulty in obtaining nationality. Other persons who may be naturalised include:

- Illegitimate children born prior to 2005 of a native Emaswati mother and a known father, whose birth is registered;
- Children born abroad to an Emaswati father who was also born abroad can apply for registration within one year of attaining majority;
- Adoptees whose parents are Emaswati automatically acquire nationality at completion of a legal adoption; or
- The wife of an Emaswati national may acquire nationality by declaration upon marriage.

=== By khonta ===
Persons who have the support of the chiefs' council may acquire nationality under special provisions. Under traditional law and customary practice in Eswatini, foreigners and their wives who are accepted into a chiefdom are granted a piece of land on which they can build and farm. Unmarried women who have a male child can also be granted land title. This system, known as khonta allows the person to receive a certificate of acceptance by a specific chief to his territory as authorized by the King. Since passage of the 1992 Citizenship Act, attaining a certificate of khonta automatically grants nationality without the requirement for registration or formal naturalisation.

== Loss of nationality ==
Emaswati nationals can renounce their nationality pending approval by the state to confirm the person will not become stateless. Naturalised persons may be denaturalised in Eswatini for fraud, misrepresentation, or concealment in a naturalisation petition; for acquiring dual nationality; or for residing outside of the country for an extended period of time exceeding seven years. There are no provisions for reacquisition of lost nationality in the statutes of Eswatini.

== Dual nationality ==
Since 1967, dual nationality, with government authorization, is typically allowed in Eswatini for nationals by birth, but not naturalised persons.

== History ==
=== Swazi Nation (1750–1906) ===
Clan groups which had independently migrated for three centuries into the area between the Lebombo Mountains and Pongola River came to accept the rule of the House of Dlamini in the mid-eighteenth century. Under the leadership of Ngwane III, inhabitants of the region were conquered or assimilated and the Swazi Nation was founded around 1770. During the Mfecane era, conflict with the Zulu Kingdom pushed Ngwane's subjects northward to the Mdzimba Mountains in the center of what would become Swaziland. In the tradition of royal divinity, the Swazi King was an agent of the gods and possessed divine powers which allowed him to rule as an absolute monarch. In exchange for his protection and maintenance of law and order, his subjects owed him unquestioned loyalty and obedience. The King used military conscription and favoritism to expand his power. By bestowing the authority to practice rituals on some chiefs and withholding it from others or bringing conscripts to the capital and allowing them to share in the bounty from raids and tribute payments, the king shifted loyalty from local chieftains to his central authority. To further centralise control, royal wives and princes were sent to govern in the provinces and were served by royally-appointed administrators, replacing the traditional chiefs.

By 1860, the Swazi Nation had grown and the Kingdom came into contact and conflict with the Boer Republic of Transvaal. A disputed succession after the death of Mswati II in 1865, led to an internal struggle and a scramble from external powers to gain influence in the nation. The 1867 discovery of diamonds in the Transvaal, followed by the 1871 discovery of gold, led to an influx of Europeans, anxious to secure prospecting concessions in the region. In the 1870s, conflict with the Zulu reemerged, as did hostilities with the Pedi people, and another succession crisis in 1874 with the suspicious death of King Ludvonga. These factors, combined with the destabilising invasion of miners, led the British to annex the Transvaal, which included the Swazi territory, in 1877. Resentful of the annexation, conflict between the Boers and British escalated into the First Boer War in 1880. At the conclusion of conflict, the Pretoria Convention of 1881, recognised the independence of the Transvaal and the British formally established a protectorate over Swaziland.

=== British protectorate (1881–1968) ===
When British protectorates were established in 1815, there was little difference between the rights of British subjects and protected persons. By 1914, British protectorates were considered to be foreign territories lacking an internal government. When Britain extended this status over a territory, it took responsibility for both internal and external administration, including defense and foreign relations. Indigenous persons who were born in a protectorate were known as British Protected Persons (BPP) and were not entitled to be British nationals. BPPs had no right of return to the United Kingdom and were unable to exercise rights of citizenship; however, they could be issued a passport and could access diplomatic services when traveling abroad. Persons born in a British protectorate to a father who was a British national derived their nationality from their parent. Following the second British annexation of the Transvaal and Second Boer War, in 1903, an Order in Council was passed by the British Parliament to allow the protectorate to be administered by the governor of Transvaal. Administration passed to the high commissioner for Basutoland, Bechuanaland, and Swaziland in 1906. In 1967, Swaziland's status was changed from a protectorate to a protected state, granting Swazis internal self-government under a constitution.

==== British subjects living in the Swaziland Protectorate (1881–1968) ====
In 1911, at the Imperial Conference a decision was made to draft a common nationality code for use across the British Empire. The British Nationality and Status of Aliens Act 1914 allowed local jurisdictions in the self-governing Dominions to continue regulating nationality in their territories, but also established an imperial nationality scheme for use throughout the realm. The uniform law, which went into effect on 1 January 1915, required a married woman to derive her nationality from her spouse, meaning if he was British, she was also, and if he was foreign, so was she. It stipulated that upon loss of nationality of a husband, a wife could declare that she wished to remain British. It also provided that if a marriage had terminated, through death or divorce, a British-born national who had lost her status through marriage could reacquire British nationality through naturalisation without meeting a residency requirement. The statute reiterated common law provisions for natural-born persons born within the realm on or after the effective date. By using the word person, the statute nullified legitimacy requirements for jus soli nationals, meaning an illegitimate child could derive nationality from its mother. For those born abroad on or after the effective date, legitimacy was still required, and could only be derived by a child from a British father (one generation), who was natural-born or naturalised. Naturalisations required five years residence or service to the Crown.

Amendments to the British Nationality Act were enacted in 1918, 1922, 1933 and 1943 changing derivative nationality by descent and modifying slightly provisions for women to lose their nationality upon marriage. Because of a rise in statelessness, a woman who did not automatically acquire her husband's nationality upon marriage or upon his naturalisation in another country, did not lose their British status after 1933. The 1943 revision allowed a child born abroad at any time to be a British national by descent if the Secretary of State agreed to register the birth. Under the terms of the British Nationality Act 1948, British nationals in Swaziland were reclassified at that time as "Citizens of the UK and Colonies" (CUKC). The basic British nationality scheme did not change overmuch, and typically those who were previously defined as British remained the same. Changes included that wives and children no longer automatically acquired the status of the husband or father, children who acquired nationality by descent no longer were required to make a retention declaration, and registrations for children born abroad were extended.

==== British protected persons living in the Swaziland Protectorate (1881–1968) ====
In 1914, the Alien Restriction Act clarified that while BPPs were not nationals, neither were they aliens. When the law was amended in 1919, that provision remained the same, meaning that BPPs could not naturalise. Until 1934, when the British Protected Persons Order was drafted, the status of BPP was not statutory, but rather granted at the prerogative of the monarch. Under the 1934 Order, Belonger status with regard to protected territories was defined to mean persons born before or after the Order in a protectorate who possessed no nationality and were not a British subject, or persons born abroad to a native of a protectorate who were stateless and not British subjects. The statute extended BPP status to children and wives of BPPs, if they were stateless, and specifically provided that if a woman married someone who was a national of another nation, she lost her BPP status. In 1943, the British Nationality Act clarified that BPPs born abroad in territories that were within the Crown's dominions were British subjects by virtue of jus soli, but those born within a protectorate were not subjects.

Under the terms of the British Nationality Act 1948, the status of BPPs in Swaziland did not change. However, the Act, while retaining the provisions that BPPs were not aliens and could not naturalise, allowed BPPs to register as BPP of a protected place or as a British subject under certain conditions. In 1949, the British Protectorates, Protected States and Protected Persons Order in Council repealed former orders about BPPs and detailed provisions for conferring protected status. It provided that protected persons were BPPs of a protectorate if they were born there; if they were born abroad to a father who was a native of a protectorate; or if at the time of their birth their father was a BPP. It also allowed women married to BPPs to register as a BPP and allowed certain nationals of foreign countries to register as BPPs. Minor changes to protected persons' status were made by Orders of Council in 1952, 1953, 1958, 1960, 1961, and 1962, but major changes did not occur until 1965.

Under the 1965 Order, the provisions of the 1949 order were retained, but new provisions for BPPs at birth included as BPPS, persons who would, except for the death of their father, have become BPPs; persons born aboard a ship or aircraft registered in a protectorate or unregistered but owned by the government of a protectorate; and foundlings discovered in a protectorate. In addition, stateless persons born prior to 28 January 1949 were allowed to register as BPPs if either of their parents were, or would have been except for death, BPPs on that date. Stateless persons born after that date could register if their parents were BPPs at the time of the child's birth. The drafting of the 1967 Constitution of Swaziland conferred nationality upon anyone born in the territory and anyone born outside the territory, prior to 24 April 1967, whose father was a native-born Swazi. Those born after independence would acquire nationality if their father was a Swazi national. Persons who had been naturalised in Swaziland, and persons who would have become nationals except for the death of their father prior to independence, were able to register as nationals. Subsequently, the Swaziland Citizenship Act of 1967 was passed, as was the Independence Act of 1968. Under the Citizenship Act, women who were married to Swazi nationals could register as nationals, as could persons who had been accepted as a Swazi (was considered khonta'd) as per custom. Legal adults of good character, who had resided in Swaziland for seven years and spoke English or siSwati and intended to keep a permanent residence in Swaziland could apply for naturalisation.

=== Post-independence (1968–present) ===
Swaziland gained full independence on 6 September 1968 under the Independence Constitution which provided for a Westminster system of governance. In an auto-coup d'état on 12 April 1973, the 1968 Constitution was repealed by King Sobhuza II. His actions were prompted by a legal action concerning the election of Bhekindlela T. Ngwenya to the Parliament of Swaziland. It was alleged that Ngwenya, who had been born in South Africa was not a Swazi national. He challenged the deportation order which declared he was a prohibited immigrant and the High Court of Swaziland set aside the deportation order. The King appealed the decision and before the appeal could be heard, abrogated the constitution and amended the Immigration Act of 1972. Ngwenya was invited to appear before a tribunal established by the amendment to the Immigration Act to defend his claim to nationality. Though the tribunal determined he was not Swazi, Ngwenya launched an appeal. The Court of Appeals overturned the tribunal's decision on the basis that the tribunal was established by the legislature to interfere with the judiciary's authority.

In reaction, King Sobhuza II declared on 12 April 1973, the King's Proclamation to the Nation, granting himself autocracy and vesting all executive, judicial, and legislative authority in himself, ruling by royal decrees and proclamations. Sobhuza issued a royal decree (Citizenships Order 1974) with an effective date of 12 April 1973 which provided that persons who became nationals at independence could only retain that status if their father was a Swazi national at the time of their birth and if born abroad, the father had at the time of the child's birth a permanent domicile in Swaziland. The order maintained provisions for wives, children whose parents had died, and persons with khonta'd to register as nationals. The decree meant that there were numerous persons who lost their Swazi nationality in 1973. In 1978, Order 23 (Establishment of the Parliament of Swaziland), reconstituted the Parliament of Swaziland, but did not lift the ban on political parties, nor the absolute authority of the King for all three governmental branches. When King Sobhuza II died, his successor Mswati III's first royal decree when he assumed office in 1987 was to confirm his absolute authority.

As both the High and Appellate Courts had ruled that the constitution had been unlawfully repealed, the King ordered commissions in 1992 and 1996 to evaluate developing a new constitution. The committee findings were confidential and only disclosed to the King. Though unable to draft a constitution, the Citizenship Act was redrafted in 1992. It provided for children to acquire nationality from either parent, with conditions. Children born to Emaswati fathers were automatically nationals, but children born to Emaswati mothers must have been illegitimate and their nationality was subject to conditions. To derive nationality automatically from the mother, a child must have been illegitimate and the father must have been unknown, had no nationality, or if known refused to claim the child. Children born within a marriage to an Emaswati mother and a foreign father were required to apply for naturalisation. The automatic right to nationality by birth for children born abroad occurred only if one parent was born in Eswatini. Children born abroad to an Emaswati national who was also born abroad were required to declare that they wish to retain Emaswati nationality within one year of reaching majority or it was forfeited.

In 2002, civil society organisations took the matter of abrogating the 1968 Constitution to court. The High Court of Swaziland and the appellate court ruled that the repeal of the constitution was unlawful. The ruling by the Court of Appeal stated that the King did not have the authority to rule by decree, prompting an official response that the court could not deprive the authority of the monarch and the ruling would be ignored. In response, the entire bench of the appellate court resigned. The King appointed another constitutional drafting committee which produced a draft constitution in 2003. The draft was criticised by both local and international organisations for its lack of consultation with the public and transparency. The King summoned his subjects to debate the draft at the Ludzidzini Royal Village. Despite complaints from human rights organisations that the discussion curtailed participation, in 2004, the constitution was submitted to parliament.

With the passage of the 2005 Constitution, a discrepancy in law occurred, as the constitution only allows children born after it went into effect to derive nationality from a father. The constitution supersedes the Citizenship Act, thus its provisions override provisions in the nationality law. Though the government answered a 2013 Universal Periodic Review with regard to the discrepancy that its approach allows women to exercise their rights in a manner consistent with Swazi law and custom, the reviewers noted that the constitution does not allow women equal pathways for their children or foreign spouse to derive their nationality. Sections 43, 46, 48 of the 2005 Constitution, by providing nationality solely paternally establish discriminatory principles and contradict Article 20 of the same instrument, which prohibits discrimination on the basis of age, birth, colour, creed or religion, disability, ethnic origin or race, gender, political allegiance, or socio-economic class. In 2018, the name of the Kingdom of Swaziland was officially changed to Eswatini. In 2021, the government was in the process of reviewing the nationality law and had made commitments to human rights organisations which monitor international agreements that changes would be forthcoming by 2024.
