= Suzanne Mbomback =

Cameroonian high school teacher and politician

- Born: October 10, 1956
- Died: August 3, 2010 (aged 53)
- Other name: Suzanne Marie Cécile Bandolo Essamba
- Citizenship: Cameroon
- Occupation: High school teacher
- Known for: Activism
- Title: Minister of Women's Empowerment and the Family
- Political party: Cameroon People's Democratic Movement

Suzanne Mbomback (October 10, 1956 – August 3, 2010), also known as Suzanne Marie Cécile Bandolo Essamba, was a high school teacher and Cameroonian politician. She was appointed Minister of Women's Empowerment and the Family (Minproff) on December 8, 2004.

== Academic activities and career ==
Prior to her appointment as Minister, Suzanne Mbomback attended primary and secondary school in Yaoundé and later obtained her bachelor's degree in 1976. She did and completed secretarial studies, graduating with a Higher Technical Certificate and a BIPCT in administrative technique. At the end of her academic career, she obtained a technical high school teaching diploma, which made her prevail as a teacher in the technical colleges of Yaoundé and Sangmélima.

In 2000, she was appointed to the position of Pedagogic Inspector at the Provincial Delegation of Education for the Centre Region.

== Politics ==
In 1999, she began her political career as founding president of the grassroots committee in the Women's Wing of the Cameroon People's Democratic Movement (WCPDM) of the South Essos Section.

From 2004 to 2009, she acted as the Minister of Women Empowerment and the Family (Minproff).

In 2007, she initiated collective marriages in Cameroon in an effort to curb cohabitation.

Long before these marriages, she had organized seminars that educated future spouses on the legal, sociological, and psychological aspects of marriage.

Her fight against genital mutilation led her to the northern regions, where she opened several women's empowerment centers and deplored the action of the excisors who subsequently left the slides.
