= Ecuadorian nationality law =

Ecuadorian nationality is the status of being a citizen of Ecuador. Ecuadorian nationality is typically obtained either on the principle of jus soli, i.e. by birth in Ecuador; or under the rules of jus sanguinis, i.e. by birth abroad to at least one parent with Ecuadorian nationality. It can also be granted to a permanent resident, who has lived in Ecuador for a given period of time, through naturalization.

Most Ecuadorians are Ecuadorian citizens.

== Legal framework ==
Ecuadorian nationality is regulated by the 2008 Constitution of Ecuador and the Naturalization Law of 1976 (Spanish: Ley de Naturalización de 1976). Some articles of the Naturalization Law of 1976 conflict with the 2008 Constitution, however Article 424 of the constitution establishes that it prevails over any other legal orders.

== Nationality by birth ==
Ecuadorian nationality is granted to a person who is:

- born within the territory of Ecuador, without exception; OR
- born abroad to Ecuadorian parents who were birthright nationals or had a grandparent or great-grandparent who was Ecuadorian by birth; OR
- part of an indigenous group which has been recognized by the nation AND is living in the national territory.

== Naturalization ==
=== Eligibility ===
Those who can apply for naturalization include:

- Foreigners who meet the eligibility requirements for a naturalization card,
- Foreign minors who have been adopted,
- Children born abroad to naturalized Ecuadorians, who declare their desire to be Ecuadorian while minors,
- Foreigners who are married to or in a partnership with an Ecuadorian national, or
- Those who have provided service to the nation.

Applicants are required to:

- have legal capacity,
- be economically self-sufficient,
- have established legal residence in the territory for a sufficient time period,
- meet conduct requirements,
- speak and write Spanish, and
- have a general knowledge of the geography, history and constitution.

Applicants must not have served time in prison, have insufficient means for support, suffer from chronic or contagious diseases, engage in activities that are at odds with national security, or engage in illegal or immoral activities.

=== Residence period ===
In general, applicants must have resided in Ecuador for 3 years as a permanent resident. Usually the status of permanent resident can be obtained after temporary residence for 2 years. Therefore the total residence requirement is usually 5 years.

The permanent residence period is shortened to 2 years if the applicant is married to or has children with an Ecuadorian woman. And the permanent residence period is waived for women married to or is widowed from an Ecuadorian man.

Residence must be uninterrupted, which is usually taken to mean that the person cannot have been absent from Ecuador for more than 90 days in any given year.

=== Process ===
Applications are presented to the Ministry of Foreign Affairs with adequate documentation. Naturalization is granted at the discretion of the President of Ecuador and bestowed by resolution.

== Loss of Ecuadorian nationality ==
The 2009 Constitution states that Ecuadorian nationality can only be lost by voluntary renunciation.

However, under the provisions of the Naturalization Law of 1976, naturalized Ecuadorians can have their nationality cancelled and be expelled for:

- having acquired nationality by fraudulent documentation;
- engaging in activities that pose a moral, political or social threat to the nation; or
- leaving the country for more than three uninterrupted years without valid justification.

== Dual nationality ==
In 1964, Ecuador and Spain signed a bilateral treaty in which each recognized the acceptance of dual nationality for the other. Dual nationality in Ecuador was first introduced in the Constitution of 1995. Since 2008, the constitution has provided that nationality in Ecuador "is a political and legal bond between individuals and the State, without detriment to their belonging to any of the other indigenous nations that coexist in plurinational Ecuador".

== History ==
Ecuador gained independence from Spain in 1822 and joined Gran Colombia as the Southern Department. In 1830, the nation separated from Gran Colombia and in that year drafted the first national constitution. (Note: Though women were not barred from citizenship, their exclusion was implied in each constitution adopted between 1830 and 1929, because of delineation between nationals who had civil rights and those who did not. Citizenship was limited to married men, who were literate and over the age of twenty-one.) It provided that Ecuadorians were children born in the territory and their descendants; nationals living in the territory that were from other states of Gran Colombia; soldiers or foreigners who had supported Ecuadorian independence; and naturalized foreigners. Five years later a new constitution was adopted which expanded the definition of nationals to include those born in the territory, those who had ancestral ties to the territory and were willing to live in the country, and those who were naturalized. It did not recognize children born abroad to Ecuadorian parents as nationals, unless the family was residing in Ecuador and required that nationality was based on establishing domicile, jus domicilis. (Note: The Ecuadorian Code states in Article 67: "La mujer casada no divorciada sigue el domicilio del marido, miéntras éste reside en Ecuador". [The undivorced married woman follows the husband's domicile, while he resides in Ecuador.] Ecuadorian interpretation of domicile is that it is the permanent residence which defines not only one's civil address for establishing the jurisdiction of rights to which they are entitled, but also for establishing the jurisdiction of their relationship to the state. Article 56 of the code specifies "La constitución y efectos del domicilio político pertenecen al Derecho Internacional". [The constitution and effects of the political domicile pertain to international law.]) The 1835 Constitution also allowed foreign men married to Ecuadorian women favorable conditions to naturalize, reducing the length of residence from five years to two years. It shortened the residency requirement for a foreign woman married to an Ecuadorian man to three years.

A commission was established to draft a civil code in 1836, based upon the Bolivian Código Santa Cruz. The commission failed to complete the task and subsequent groups attempted to draft a code without success. Nine new constitutions were devised between 1835 and 1929, most amendments had little to do with changes to nationality. The 1837 Constitution provided that if a foreigner naturalized, his wife and children automatically derived his new nationality. Foreign women, upon marriage with husbands who were Ecuadorian, automatically acquired Ecuadorian nationality, under provisions of the 1845 Constitution. In 1850, the new constitution provided that naturalized Ecuadorians' children born abroad were no longer eligible for Ecuadorian nationality, unless the parents were abroad and in the government service. In like manner, Ecuadorian nationality was suspended if a naturalized citizen established a domicile outside the territory without being in service to the government.

The Constitution of 1852, according to academic Francisco Vetancourt Aristeguieta, who wrote Nacionalidad, naturalización y ciudadanía en Hispano-América (Nationality, Naturalization and Citizenship in Hispanic-America, 1957), did not contain language that stated that Ecuadorian women married to foreign men lost their nationality, but it was implied that they were denationalized by Article 6, number 3. (Note: "Como a tenor del número 3^{ọ} del artículo 6^{ọ}, eran ecuatorianas por naturalización las extranjeras casadas con ecuatoriano, y no especificando la Constitución, que el Ecuador aceptaba la consecuente desnacionalización de la ecuatoriana casada con extranjero…" ["According to article 6, number 3, foreigners married to Ecuadorian men were Ecuadorian by naturalization, and without specifying that in the Constitution, Ecuador accepted the consequent denationalization of Ecuadorian woman married to foreigners…"]) It reinstated birthright nationality to children born abroad to Ecuadorians if they returned to the territory. In 1857, the Supreme Court took over the civil code project and presented a modification of Andrés Bello's Chilean Civil Code to Congress. It was approved and went into effect in 1860. Under the code, married women were legally incapacitated and their civil rights were subject to their husbands' authority. She was required to share his domicile, while living in Ecuador.

In 1878, the constitution returned to granting nationality to anyone born in Ecuador regardless of the nationality of the parents, but it allowed children born abroad to Ecuadorian parents to have birthright nationality if they established residence in the country and requested to be nationals. The first Law of Alienship (Ley de Extranjería) was passed in 1886 and had provisions to exclude, reject, and expel certain types of immigrants, particularly those of Chinese or Roma descent. The Constitution of 1906 introduced a provision that a child born in the country to unknown parents had birthright nationality. It also allowed minor children upon reaching their majority and wives or widows of naturalized Ecuadorians to choose to continue to have Ecuadorian nationality. It was the first constitution to include consent and did not require that an Ecuadorian woman who married a foreigner to lose her original nationality. However, it required a foreign woman to derive nationality from her husband unless she renounced it.

The amended Law of Alienship passed in 1921, specified that a woman lost her nationality if she married a foreigner whose country automatically derived her citizenship from his or if she left the country. The law allowed a widow to repatriate by making a declaration that she wished to regain her Ecuadorian nationality before the proper authorities. A foreign man's wife automatically derived his nationality upon naturalization or loss of nationality upon his choice to relinquish nationality. She could, however, if granted her husband's permission, obtain Ecuadorian nationality separately from his status. In like manner, an Ecuadorian wife could renounce her nationality if her husband allowed her to do so. According to the 1929 constitution, children born in the country were Ecuadorian regardless of their parents' nationality. Children, who were legitimate, legitimized, or illegitimate but legally recognized, and born abroad to Ecuadorian parents in the service of the government were also nationals, as were children of the same categories born abroad to Ecuadorian parents who later chose Ecuadorian nationality and established residency in the country. The naturalization or renunciation of a father automatically changed the nationality of his minor children, though they could renounce or acquire Ecuadorian nationality upon reaching majority by following the designated legal procedures. A married woman was unable to change the nationality of her children under the constitution of 1929.

In 1933, the Ecuadorian delegates to the Pan-American Union's Montevideo conference, signed the Inter-American Convention on the Nationality of Women, which became effective in 1934, without legal reservations. The 1929 Constitution remained in effect until 1945. The Constitution of 1945 introduced the concept of dual nationality for Spaniards and Latin Americans and in Article 13 provided that neither marriage or dissolution of a marriage had an effect on nationality. The following year, the new constitution removed the clauses regarding dual nationality, but they were reintroduced for Spaniards and Latin Americans in the constitutions of 1967 and 1978. In 1995, Ecuador unilaterally allowed dual citizenship and in 1998 the legislature modified the constitution to completely remove exceptions for discrepancies between nationality requirements, though there remained curtailment of some access to civil rights.
