= Cameroonian nationality law =

Cameroonian Nationality Code

Parliament of Cameroon
- Long title: Code de la nationalité camerounaise
- Enacted by: Government of Cameroon
- Status: Current legislation

Cameroonian nationality law is regulated by the Constitution of Cameroon, as amended; the Nationality Code of Cameroon (French: Code de la nationalité camerounaise), and its revisions; and various international agreements to which the country is a signatory. These laws determine who is, or is eligible to be, a national of Cameroon. The legal means to acquire nationality, formal legal membership in a nation, differ from the domestic relationship of rights and obligations between a national and the nation, known as citizenship. Cameroonian nationality is typically obtained under the principle of jus sanguinis, i.e. by birth in Cameroon or abroad to parents with Cameroonian nationality. It can be granted to persons with an affiliation to the country, or to a permanent resident who has lived in the country for a given period of time through naturalization.

== Acquisition of nationality ==
Nationality can be acquired in Cameroon at birth or later in life through naturalization.

=== By birth ===
- Persons born legitimately anywhere to at least one parent who is Cameroonian;
- Persons born illegitimately to two Cameroonian parents, to one Cameroonian parent if that parent was the first parent to establish a filiation, or to a stateless person who first established filiation and whose spouse is Cameroonian; or
- Foundlings or orphans born in the territory of unknown parentage; or
- Persons born in Cameroon who are stateless.

=== By naturalization ===
Naturalization can be granted to persons of the age of majority and legal capacity who have resided in the territory for a sufficient period of time to confirm they understand the customs and traditions of the society. General provisions are that applicants be of good character, have no criminal history, and are in good physical and mental health. Nationality may also be granted for service to the nation or under exceptional circumstances. The general residency requirement is five years, but there is no residency period required for individuals who have performed exemplary services to the nation. Besides foreigners meeting the criteria, other persons who may be naturalized include:

- Persons born in Cameroon who have resided in Cameroon for at least five years prior to a date within six months of reaching the age of majority;
- Adoptees who are residing in Cameroon at the time of adoption and upon declaration of nationality six months prior to reaching majority;
- Minor children who are married or of legal age may declare the right to Cameroonian nationality, if their Cameroonian parent reclaimed nationality;
- The wife of a Cameroonian husband may acquire his nationality by declaration upon legal marriage;
- The husband of a Cameroonian wife may naturalize without a residency period; or
- Persons who were previously nationals of Cameroon and wish to regain nationality, upon approval of a presidential decree.

== Loss of nationality ==
Nationality may be renounced in Cameroon by following the proper registration procedures. Persons can be denaturalized for committing fraud in a naturalization petition, committing a crime or disloyal act against the state, serving another state without authorization, or the voluntary acquisition of dual nationality.

== Dual nationality ==
Cameroon does not presently allow dual nationality.

== History ==
=== African empires (609BC-1884) ===
The territory between the Mandara Mountains, which today form the northern Cameroon–Nigeria border, and Lake Chad was populated by diverse people who had different cultural and political structures. From 609 BC migrants from the Near East settled in the region and established large and powerful empires. One of these states was the Kanem–Bornu Empire, with the former lasting to the end of the fourteenth century, and being supplanted when the capital was moved to Birni N'gazargamu in Bornu. Political centralization was characteristic to the empire and a means to dominate trade throughout the region. The Kanem empire attempted to enforce vassalage on the smaller communities which pre-existed in the area and interacted with other later significant states, such as the Wandala Kingdom, also known as Mandara Kingdom and the Sokoto Caliphate. Each of these states were expansionist and militaristic.

The Wandala Kingdom was founded between 1440 and 1450 in the northern part of the territory. From the beginning of the eighteenth century, some of the vassal states of Bornu began to press for autonomy because stress for sharing resources created conflict. People from the Sultanate of Baghirmi and nomadic Tuareg groups raided Bornu territories and by 1759, the empire had lost control of the salt mines at Bilma and trade routes through the Sahara. Though there is evidence that the Kanuri-Bornu Empire attempted to involve itself in the political succession of Wandala, it was a fairly minor state until 1780. That year, Wandala defeated an attack by the Bornu Empire, precipitating the decline of Bornu, leading to the sacking of Birni N'gazargamu in 1808, during the Fulani War. That year, the Sokoto Caliphate was founded, replacing previous states in Hausaland. New polities emerged from the former Hausa states, which now were aligned with the Sokoto Caliphate, and included the Adamawa, Bauchi, Gombe, Muri and Nufe Emirates.

English and Dutch traders and missionaries began establishing themselves in the region from 1844. In 1868, Carl Woermann. a merchant from Hamburg established a trading house on the Kamerun River, now known as the Wouri River. In 1874, Woermann's son, Adolph, joined the business and began implementing plans to expand their enterprise by eliminating his competitors, the native people. His agent, Johannes Thormählen, first requested that a German consul be sent to the region that year. Chancellor of Germany, Otto von Bismarck was reluctant to grant the request, believing that business enterprises should finance colonization efforts rather than the state. Thormählen then formed with Wilhelm Jantzen, Woermann's agent in Liberia, their own trading company operating between Hamburg and West Africa. The network of Adolph Woermann and Jantzen & Thormählen controlled half of the trade coming out of West Africa through their network of trading posts and shipping services by 1882. In 1883, Woermann used his influence to persuade the Hamburg Board of Trade to allow him to send warships to protect German merchants and together with Jantzen & Thormählen secured agreements with the chiefs along the Cameroonian coast to cede their sovereign rights to Germany. In 1884, having been elected to the Reichstag, Woermann was able to convince Bismark to establish colonies in Africa as protection for German commercial interests.

=== German protectorate (1884–1919) ===
In July 1884, Bismark appointed Gustav Nachtigal as Consul-General of the Colony of Kamerun. He continued the practice of obtaining treaties with chiefs in the colony, but at the end of that year, resistance to German occupation resulted in attempts by natives to disrupt trade. Two German corvettes were sent to quell the uprising and secure German authority in the colony. Under the terms of the German Colonial Act of 1888, German colonies were not part of the federal union, but they were also not considered foreign. Thus, laws that were extended to the colonies sometimes treated residents as nationals and other times as foreigners. German law applied to those subjects who had been born in Germany. Native subjects in the colonies were not considered to be German, but were allowed to naturalize. Naturalization required ten years residence in the territory and proof of self-employment. It was automatically bestowed upon all members of a family, meaning children and wives derived the nationality of the husband.

In 1911, disputes between German and French authorities, resulted in France ceding a large portion of their territory in French Congo to the Germans in exchange for German recognition of French authority in the Moroccan Protectorate. The area granted under the Treaty of Fez was known as Neukamerun. The Nationality Law of 1913 changed the basis for acquiring German nationality from domicile to patrilineality, but did not alter derivative nationality. In 1914, during World War I, Belgian, British, and French colonial troops, made up of mostly Africans launched the two-year Kamerun campaign. Securing the territory in 1916, Neukamerun was returned to France. The remainder of the territory was assigned at the end of the war in 1919 as a protected territory of both France and Britain.

=== British-French mandate/trust territory (1922–1960) ===
In 1922, the Cameroons, known as British Cameroon and French Cameroun, became League of Nations mandated territories, under the shared authority of the two countries. The British section was located in the western 1/5th of the country and administrated through the British Colony of Nigeria. France administered the remaining 4/5ths of the territory. At the end of World War II, the League of Nations was transformed into the United Nations and the mandated territories were known as Trust Territories. The goal of the trusteeship system was to shepherd the protectorates toward self-governance and eventual independence.

==== Nationality in British Cameroon ====
Under British law, mandated territories were outside the Crown's dominions, meaning British nationality laws did not apply to natives, but only to British subjects born to British fathers who may have been domiciled in a mandated place. (Note: A commission was convened in 1946 to review nationality of the inhabitants in former German colonies. It concluded that inhabitants of mandates did not acquire British nationality and if they had been German nationals under the terms of the 1913 Nationality law, they became stateless when Germany abandoned its territories. According to D. P. O'Connell, they were deemed to be "lacking nationality but enjoying an administrative status analogous to that of inhabitants of British protectorates".) As a protected territory, Britain took responsibility for both internal and external administration, including defense and foreign relations. Indigenous persons who were born in a mandate were treated as British Protected Persons (BPP) and were not entitled to be British nationals. BPPs had no right of return to the United Kingdom and were unable to exercise rights of citizenship; however, they could be issued a passport and could access diplomatic services when traveling abroad.

Under the British Nationality and Status of Aliens Act 1914, which established an imperial nationality scheme for use throughout the British Empire, common law provisions were reiterated for natural-born persons born within the realm on or after the effective date. By using the word person, the statute nullified legitimacy requirements for jus soli nationals, meaning an illegitimate child could derive nationality from its mother. For those born abroad on or after the effective date, legitimacy was still required, and could only be derived by a child from a British father (one generation), who was natural-born or naturalized. It also provided that a married woman derived her nationality from her spouse, meaning if he was British, she was also, and if he was foreign, so was she. It stipulated that upon loss of nationality of a husband, a wife could declare that she wished to remain British. It allowed that if a marriage had terminated, through death or divorce, a British-born national who had lost her status through marriage could reacquire British nationality through naturalization without meeting a residency requirement. The statute reiterated Naturalization required five years residence or service to the crown.

Amendments to the British Nationality Act were enacted in 1918, 1922, 1933 and 1943 changing derivative nationality by descent and modifying slightly provisions for women to lose their nationality upon marriage. Because of a rise in statelessness, a woman who did not automatically acquire her husband's nationality upon marriage or upon his naturalization in another country, did not lose her British status after 1933. The 1943 revision allowed a child born abroad at any time to be a British national by descent if the Secretary of State agreed to register the birth. Under the terms of the British Nationality Act 1948, British nationals in the Nigeria Colony and British Cameroon were reclassified at that time as "Citizens of the UK and Colonies" (CUKC) and native-born inhabitants in Cameroon became statutory BPPs. The basic British nationality scheme did not change overmuch, and typically those who were previously defined as British remained the same. Changes included that wives and children no longer automatically acquired the status of the husband or father, children who acquired nationality by descent no longer were required to make a retention declaration, and registrations for children born abroad were extended.

On 1 October 1960, the Colony of Nigeria gained its independence. Subsequently, the inhabitants of the northern part of British Cameroon voted to become part of Nigeria on 1 June 1961. By the Northern Cameroons Administration Amendment Order of Council 1961/988 and an amendment Act (Law 24) to the Nigerian Constitution, Northern Cameroon was incorporated into the Federal Republic of Nigeria. Under the terms of the constitutional amendment, persons who were CUKCs or BPPs born in Northern Cameroon or the wife of a person meeting the criteria effectively became Nigerian nationals. Under a plebescite held on 11 February 1961, the inhabitants of southern British Cameroon, voted to join an independent French Cameroun by a margin of 7 to 3. The native inhabitants of Southern Cameroon remained BPPs under the trust agreement until 1 October 1961.

==== Nationality in French Cameroun ====
Under French law, B-type mandates were construed to be outside of French territory and were to be administered without a nationality code. (Note: According to Philippe Bourmaud, a history professor at Jean Moulin University Lyon 3, type A mandates required that the trustee promulage a nationality code granting blanket nationality to the inhabitants. Type B and C mandated territories were seen as not sufficiently developed in their political organization to require nationality legislation.) France was barred from granting blanket nationality to the inhabitants of French Cameroun. From 1848, natives of France who settled in French territories were French nationals and were subject to French law. This meant that from 1848 when the Civil Code was extended to all of the French nationals in the colonies, women were legally incapacitated and paternal authority was established over their children. Upon marriage, a woman married to a French man automatically acquired the same nationality as her spouse. Illegitimate children were barred from inheritance and nationality could only be transmitted through a French father. Under the Code de l'indigénat (Code of Indigenous Status) promulgated for Algeria in 1881, and extended to Cameroun in 1924, native inhabitants in French colonies and territories followed customary law.

In 1927, France passed a new Nationality Law, which under Article 8, removed the requirement for married women to automatically derive the nationality of a husband and provided that her nationality could only be changed if she consented to change her nationality. It also allowed children born in France to native-born French women married to foreigners to acquire their nationality from their mothers. When it was implemented it included Guadeloupe, Martinique and Réunion but was extended to the remaining French territories in 1928. A decade later, the legal incapacity of married women was finally invalidated for French nationals. After World War II, France strove to create policies which would integrate the inhabitants of its trust territories into the French Union. Under the Constitution of 1946, Article 60, trust territories became a legal category under the French Union. Though neither French nationals nor citizens, Camerounians were under Article 81, citizens of the French Union and entitled to enjoy the rights and freedoms guaranteed by the constitution. This meant that Cameroun was able to send 3 deputies and 2 senators to the French Parliament. France also created a Territorial Assembly of locally elected members; however, only French nationals and elite native persons were given the franchise. A decree issued on 30 April 1946 eliminated the Indigenous Code, making all inhabitants of Cameroun were now subject to French criminal and penal law.

By 1955, resistance to French colonial rule had become a violent insurgency in Cameroun. Refugees fled the territory seeking harbor in the British southern Cameroon protectorate. The following year, the French Nationality Code of 1945 was made applicable to Togo and Cameroun. Under its terms, French nationality was conferred once again automatically upon foreign wives of French men unless they expressly declined it, but allowed mothers who were French nationals to pass their nationality to children born outside of France. In 1957, Cameroun was granted internal autonomy and by a Decree issued on 16 April (Décret N° 57-501) defined the institutions and individual status of Camerounians. In Title II, the law specified that nationals of Cameroun were entitled to citizenship in Cameroun within the framework of the French Republic. The French Constitution of 1958 standardized nationality provisions France, Overseas Departments, and Overseas Territories, but under Article 77 conferred no nationality upon Camerounians.

Faced with continual upheaval, in 1959, France recognized that the African states could have separate nationality codes and still be part of the French Union. In November, Cameroun adopted a nationality code which established that nationals were legitimate children born to Camerounian fathers, children born in Cameroun who had no other nationality of origin, and foreign wives of Camerounian husbands. It also provided the illegitimate children could gain nationality if the first parent to establish a filiation with the child was Cameroonian. It allowed naturalization of foreigners after a five-year residency, or of husbands of Cameroonian wives without a residency period. Children born to two foreign parents in the territory and who had lived there for at least five years as a minor in Cameroun could acquire nationality at majority. As the independence movement became more intense, France agreed to grant independence on 1 January 1960 French Cameroun. The UN passed resolution 1349 (XIII) terminating the trusteeship for Cameroun on 13 March 1959.

=== Post-independence (1960–present) ===
The first constitution for the Republic of Cameroun was accepted by referendum held in February 1960. In July 1961, a conference was held in Foumban to discuss modifying the constitution to incorporate Southern Cameroon. Failing to reach agreement on terms, a second conference was held in August at Yaoundé. No treaty for the union was agreed upon and when the draft constitution was presented to the House of Assembly of the Southern Cameroons, it was not endorsed. The National Assembly of the Republic of Cameroun accepted the draft constitution, despite the lack of provisions to effect the integration of the two entities. The constitution which was adopted and went into effect in October changed the governance from a parliamentary system to a presidential system, in which the polity elected the executive rather than the assembly. It established the Federal Republic of Cameroon, dividing the country into two federated states, East and West Cameroon, with the latter being the former Southern Cameroon. In 1968, Cameroon revised its nationality code (Loi no. 1968-LF-3). Under the new terms a child could derive nationality through either parent, but gendered differences remained for children born in and out of marriage and for transmitting nationality to a spouse. In 1972, a new constitution was adopted which changed the administration from two states into multiple provinces and changed the name of the country to the United Republic of Cameroon.

On 13 November 1995, Cameroon became a member of the Commonwealth of Nations. In 2020 a preliminary draft of the Code of Persons and the Family (French: Code des personnes et de la famille), which would replace the Nationality Code of 1968, was released to the press. Under its terms, distinctions between legitimate and illegitimate children and their ability to acquire nationality from either of their parents are removed. It would allow for automatic acquisition of nationality for children adopted by Cameroonian parents and expand eligibility for obtaining nationality if one had grandparents who were born in Cameroon. Also included in the proposal are equitable provisions for deriving nationality from a spouse and the acceptance of dual nationality. According to Marie-Thérèse Abéna Ondoa, Minister of Women and the Family, the proposed draft was sent for review by the Ministry of Justice prior to final legislative deliberations.
