= Birth tourism =

Travel to give birth in another country

Countries by birthright citizenship: Unconditional birthright citizenship for persons born in the country Birthright citizenship with restrictions Birthright citizenship abolished No birthright citizenship

Birth tourism is the practice of traveling to another country or city for the purpose of giving birth in that country. The main reason for birth tourism is to obtain citizenship for the child in a country with birthright citizenship (jus soli). Such a child is sometimes called an "anchor baby" if their citizenship is intended to help their parents obtain permanent residency in the country. Other reasons for birth tourism other than future sponsorship for the parents include the ability to enroll the child in the host country's public schooling system, access to better healthcare for the birth parent or child, and to hedge against corruption and political instability in the parents’ home country. Popular destinations include the United States and Canada. Another target for birth tourism is Hong Kong, where some mainland Chinese residents travel to give birth to gain right of abode for their children.

In an effort to discourage birth tourism, Ireland restricted citizenship by birth to those where at least one parent is a citizen of the country, by passing the Twenty-seventh Amendment of the Constitution of Ireland in 2004. On the other hand, Germany traditionally only used jus sanguinis, but has introduced a conditional citizenship by birth in 2000.

Since 2004, no European country grants unconditional birthright citizenship (as of 2006); however, most countries in the Americas, e.g., the United States, Canada, Mexico, Argentina, and Brazil do so. In Africa, Chad, Lesotho and Tanzania grant unconditional birthright citizenship, as do some in the Asian-Pacific region including Fiji, Pakistan, and Tuvalu.

== Today ==
=== North America ===
==== United States ====
The Fourteenth Amendment to the United States Constitution, which was ratified after the Civil War to ensure that the freed slaves along with their children would get American citizenship, guarantees U.S. citizenship to those born in the United States, provided the person is "subject to the jurisdiction" of the United States. Congress has further extended birthright citizenship to all inhabited U.S. territories except American Samoa. (A person born in American Samoa becomes a non-citizen US national). The parent(s) and child are still subject to de jure and de facto deportation, respectively. However, once they reach 21 years of age, American-born children, as birthright citizens, are able to sponsor their foreign families' U.S. citizenship and residency.

Russian birth tourism to Florida to "maternity hotels" in the 2010s is documented. Birth tourism packages complete with lodging and medical care delivered in Russian begin at $20,000, and go as high as $84,700 for an apartment in Miami's Trump Tower II complete with a "gold-tiled bathtub and chauffeured Cadillac Escalade."

Ghanaian middle-class mothers and celebrities have exhibited a trend of traveling to the United States for the purposes of giving birth there. These travels occur during the third trimester of pregnancy. The primary motivation for Ghanaian birth tourism is usually U.S. Citizenship and passports for the children. Other motivations include improved maternal care and socioeconomic advantages.

One option for mainland Chinese mothers to give birth is Saipan, Northern Mariana Islands, where the cost is cheaper and travel does not require a U.S. visa. More than 70% of the newborns in Saipan have birth tourist PRC parents who take advantage of the 45-day visa-free visitation rules of the territory and the Covenant of the Northern Mariana Islands to ensure that their children can have American citizenship. There were 282 of these births in 2012. At least one airline in Hong Kong requests that women who are "observed to have a body size or shape resembling a pregnant woman" submit to a pregnancy test before they are allowed to fly to Saipan.

As of 2015, Los Angeles is considered a center of the maternity tourism industry, which caters mostly to women from China and Taiwan; authorities in the city there closed 14 maternity tourism "hotels" in 2013. The industry is difficult to close down since it is not illegal for a pregnant woman to travel to the U.S. On March 3, 2015, Federal agents in Los Angeles conducted a series of raids on three "multimillion-dollar birth-tourism businesses" expected to produce the "biggest federal criminal case ever against the booming 'anchor baby' industry", according to The Wall Street Journal.

Numerous "maternity businesses" advise pregnant mothers to hide their pregnancies from officials and commit visa fraud—lying to customs agents about their true purpose in the U.S. Once they give birth, several 'birth tourism' agencies aid the mothers in defrauding the U.S. hospital, taking advantage of discounts reserved for impoverished American mothers. Some mothers will refuse to pay the bill for the medical care received during their hospital stay.

On October 18, 2014, the North American Chinese language Daily World Journal reported that for several weeks the immigration authorities at LAX had been closely questioning pregnant Chinese women arriving there from China, and in many cases denying them entry to the United States and repatriating them within 12 hours, often on the same airplane on which they had flown to the United States. In March 2015, federal agents conducted raids on a series of large-scale maternity tourism operations bringing thousands of mainland Chinese women intent on giving their children American citizenship. Congressional representatives such as Phil Gingrey, who have tried to put an end to birth tourism, said these people are "gaming the system". In August 2015, the issue was discussed among U.S. presidential candidates, including Donald Trump and Jeb Bush.

In January 2019, U.S. Immigration and Customs Enforcement investigations led to the arrest of three southern California operators of "multimillion-dollar birth-tourism businesses" catering primarily to Chinese nationals.

Effective January 24, 2020, a new policy was adopted that made it more difficult for pregnant foreign women to come to the US to give birth on US soil to ensure their children become US citizens. The country will no longer issue temporary B-1/B-2 visitor visas to applicants seeking to enter the United States for birth tourism.

In December 2020, federal prosecutors charged six Long Island residents who were operating a birth tourism scheme that cost U.S. taxpayers over $2 million. The suspects submitted over 99 Medicaid claims for different women, assisting the births of about 119 children who now have U.S. citizenship. The suspects were charged with conspiracy to commit health care fraud, visa fraud, wire fraud and money laundering.

In April 2026, Texas attorney general Ken Paxton filed a lawsuit against a center in Houston that had allegedly engaged in birth tourism involving Chinese nationals.

As of August 6, 2026 Donald Trump signed an executive order titled "ENDING BIRTH TOURISM". The executive order requires federal agencies to restrict birth tourism. Birth tourism in this executive order is defined as entering the United States as a non-immigrant for the purposes of giving birth. The measures taken include: restrictions on visa, denial of entry, and deportation.

===== Worldwide taxation of U.S. citizens and permanent residents =====
Systems of taxation on personal income: No income tax on individuals Territorial Residential Citizenship-based

The United States, Eritrea, Hungary, Kyrgyzstan, Myanmar, and Tajikistan are currently the only countries in the world to tax their citizens worldwide, even if they have never lived in the country and were born to citizens living abroad.

A U.S.-born person is, as a citizen, automatically subject to U.S. taxation. This is true even if both parents are non-U.S. citizens, their child holds multiple citizenships, and the family leaves the U.S. right after the child's birth and never returns again. Children born to U.S. citizens living abroad are also automatically subject to U.S. taxation, even if they never enter the United States.

U.S. permanent residents are also subject to worldwide taxation. Worldwide taxation is often cited as a reason for U.S. citizens or permanent residents to relinquish their citizenship or residency status.

===== Fee for renunciation of U.S. citizenship =====
In 2015, the fee for renunciation of U.S. citizenship was raised by 422%. It went from US$450 to $2,350 and is the highest fee for the renunciation of a citizenship worldwide.

==== Canada ====
Canada’s birthright citizenship law came into effect in 1946. It was inherited from the United Kingdom, who had influence on Canada’s constitution until 1982. Although Canadian birthright citizenship was established in 1946, it didn’t differentiate from the original UK law until 1977, when its discriminatory aspects were removed. It originally discriminated on the basis of race, class, and gender.

In the modern day, Canadian jus soli is unlimited. A child is entitled to Canadian citizenship if they are born in Canada, regardless of their parents’ descent, or if they are born outside of Canada but one of their parents holds Canadian citizenship. The only exception is for children born in Canada to representatives of foreign governments or international organizations. There have been attempts to limit jus soli by Canadian officials who see it as fueling birth tourism but there haven't been any legal changes yet.

Chinese nationals are reportedly one of the biggest contributors to Canada’s birth tourism. It is reported that 98% of children born from birth tourism in Canada belong to Chinese parents, with Richmond, Canada being reportedly a hotspot for Chinese birth tourism. This occurs mainly due to Chinese parents seeking a better life, education, and stability for their children.

Some expectant Chinese parents who had already had one child would travel to Canada to give birth in order to circumvent China's (now revoked) one-child policy, additionally acquiring Canadian citizenship for the child and applying for a passport before returning to China.

Canadian officials who oppose(d) birth tourism argue that the act of birth tourism is an exploitation of Canadian policy and advocate for tighter restrictions. Those who argue otherwise say that the statistics are being manipulated to produce a prejudiced agenda against those who engage in birth tourism and that it is protected by Canadian constitution.

A Québec birth certificate entitles a student enrolled in that province to pay university tuition at the lower in-province rate; on average this was $3760/year in 2013.

==== Mexico ====
Mexicans who are citizens by birth are individuals that were born in Mexican territory regardless of parents' nationality or immigration status in Mexico. Individuals born on Mexican merchant or Navy ships or Mexican-registered aircraft, regardless of parents' nationality, are still considered Mexican citizens. Only naturalized Mexicans can lose their Mexican citizenship.

Mexican women sometimes engage in birth tourism to the United States or Canada to give their children U.S. or Canadian citizenship.

=== South America ===
Most South American countries grant unconditional birthright citizenship and allow dual citizenship; however, some countries have strict abortion laws that make them risky birth-tourism destinations in case of complications during the pregnancy. In Brazil, abortion is illegal, with the exception of cases of rape, incest or if the mother's life is in danger. It is restricted to cases of maternal life, mental health, health, rape, or fetal defects. In Chile, abortion was forbidden completely, even if the pregnant woman's life was in danger, until 2017. Current law allows abortion in Chile only if the mother's life is in danger, if the fetus is not viable and in rape cases.

Some countries do not allow their citizens to renounce their citizenship, or only do so if the citizenship was acquired by birth there to non-citizen parents. In Argentina, Brazil, Ecuador, Peru, and Uruguay, voting is compulsory for citizens. In Bolivia, Brazil, Chile, Colombia, Cuba, Guatemala, Paraguay, and Venezuela, military service is mandatory.

==== Argentina ====
Any person born in Argentine territory acquires Argentine citizenship at birth, excepting children of persons in the service of a foreign government (e.g. foreign diplomats). This can be also applied to people born in the Falkland Islands, a disputed territory between Argentina and the United Kingdom. Argentine citizens cannot renounce their Argentine citizenship.

==== Brazil ====
A person born in Brazil acquires Brazilian citizenship at birth, regardless of their parents' ancestry. It is said Brazilian citizens cannot renounce their Brazilian citizenship, but it is possible to renounce it through a requirement made in the Brazilian consulate if they already have acquired another citizenship voluntarily. Foreign tourists, parents of a Brazilian child, may apply for permanent residency in Brazil based on their child's nationality.

==== Chile ====
As of 2023, all children born in Chile acquire Chilean citizenship at birth, the only exception being children born of people working for foreign diplomatic missions. Chilean Supreme Court ruled that children of irregular immigrants are not to be considered "Transient foreigners" and therefore receive Chilean citizenship as well.

==== Paraguay ====
Any person born in Paraguay territory acquires Paraguayan citizenship at birth. The only exception applies to children of persons in the service of a foreign government (like foreign diplomats).

=== Hong Kong ===
As a non-sovereign territory, Hong Kong does not have its own citizenship; the status akin to citizenship in Hong Kong is the right of abode, also known as permanent residence.

According to the Basic Law of Hong Kong, Chinese citizens born in Hong Kong have the right of abode in the territory. The 2001 court case Director of Immigration v. Chong Fung Yuen affirmed that this right extends to the children of mainland Chinese parents who themselves are not residents of Hong Kong. As a result, there has been an influx of mainland mothers giving birth in Hong Kong in order to obtain right of abode for the child. In 2009, 36% of babies born in Hong Kong were born to parents originating from Mainland China. This has resulted in backlash from some circles in Hong Kong to increased potential stress on the territory's social welfare net and education system. Attempts to restrict benefits from such births have been struck down by the territory's courts. A portion of the Hong Kong population has reacted negatively to the phenomenon, which has exacerbated social and cultural tensions between Hong Kong and mainland China. The situation came to a boiling point in early 2012, with Hong Kongers taking to the street to protest the influx of birth tourism from mainland China.

== See also ==
- Anchor baby
- Economic results of migration
- Multiple citizenship
- Surrogacy
