= Anchor baby =

Child with birthright citizenship who helps relatives immigrate

Anchor baby is a pejorative term referring to a child born to non-citizen parents in a country that has birthright citizenship in order to help the parents and other family members gain citizenship or legal residency and/or avoid deportation in said country. In the U.S., the term is generally used as a derogatory reference to the supposed role of the child, who automatically qualifies as an American citizen under jus soli and the rights guaranteed in the Fourteenth Amendment to the U.S. Constitution. The term is also often used in the context of the debate over illegal immigration to the United States. A similar term, "passport baby", has been used in Canada for children born through so-called "maternity" or "birth tourism".

== History and usage ==
A related term, anchor child, referring in this case to "very young immigrants who will later sponsor immigration for family members who are still abroad", was used in reference to Vietnamese boat people from about 1987. In 2002 in the Irish High Court, Bill Shipsey used the term to refer to an Irish-born child whose family were his clients; in the 2003 Supreme Court judgment upholding the parents' deportation, Adrian Hardiman commented on the novelty of both the term and concomitant argument. (In Ireland jus soli citizenship was abolished in 2004.)

"Anchor baby" appeared in print in 1996, but remained relatively obscure until 2006, when it found new prominence amid the increased focus on the immigration debate in the United States. The term is generally considered pejorative. Analysis of news usage, internet links, and search engine rankings indicate that Fox News and Newsmax were pivotal in popularizing the term in the mid and late 2000s. In 2011 the American Heritage Dictionary added an entry for the term in the dictionary's new edition, which did not indicate that the term was disparaging. Following a critical blog piece by Mary Giovagnoli, the director of the Immigration Policy Center, a pro-immigration research group in Washington, the dictionary updated its online definition to indicate that the term is "offensive", similar to its entries on ethnic slurs. As of 2012, the definition reads:

n. Offensive Used as a disparaging term for a child born to a noncitizen mother in a country that grants automatic citizenship to children born on its soil, especially when the child's birthplace is thought to have been chosen in order to improve the mother's or other relatives' chances of securing eventual citizenship.

The decision to revise the definition led to some criticism from immigration opponents, such as the Center for Immigration Studies and the Federation for American Immigration Reform.

In 2012, Utah attorney general Mark Shurtleff, in a meeting designed to promote the 2010 Utah Compact declaration as a model for a federal government approach to immigration, said that "The use of the word 'anchor baby' when we're talking about a child of God is offensive."

Several journalists and public figures in the United States have been criticized for using the term anchor baby. In Australia in 2019, then-home affairs minister Peter Dutton used "anchor babies" to label the two Australian-born children of the Murugappan asylum seeker family, which opposition politician Kristina Keneally said was an attempt to import American debates that were not relevant to Australia.

=== Maternity tourism industry ===
As of 2015, Los Angeles is considered the center of the maternity tourism industry, which caters mostly to wealthy Asian women; authorities in the city there closed 14 maternity tourism "hotels" in 2013. The industry is difficult to close down since it is not illegal for a pregnant woman to travel to the U.S.

On March 3, 2015, federal agents in Los Angeles conducted a series of raids on three "multimillion-dollar birth-tourism businesses" expected to produce the "biggest federal criminal case ever against the booming 'anchor baby' industry", according to The Wall Street Journal.

==== Ireland's abolition of unconditional birthright citizenship ====
In 2005, Ireland amended its constitution to become the last country in Europe to abolish unconditional jus soli citizenship, as a direct result of concerns over birth tourism. A headline case was Chen v Home Secretary, whereby a Chinese temporary migrant living in mainland United Kingdom travelled to Belfast, Northern Ireland, to give birth to her daughter for the purpose of obtaining Irish citizenship for her daughter (Ireland's jus soli law extends to all parts of the island of Ireland, including Northern Ireland, which is part of the UK). The daughter's Irish citizenship was then used by her parents to obtain permanent residence in the UK as the parents of a dependent EU citizen.

== Immigration status (United States) ==
The Citizenship Clause of the Fourteenth Amendment to the United States Constitution indicates that "All persons born or naturalized in the United States, and subject to the jurisdiction thereof, are citizens of the United States and of the State wherein they reside." The Supreme Court of the United States affirmed in United States v. Wong Kim Ark, 169 U.S. 649 (1898), (Note: Text of United States v. Wong Kim Ark, 169 U.S. 649 (1898) is available from: Cornell CourtListener Google Scholar Internet Archive (docket files) Justia Library of Congress OpenJurist) that the Fourteenth Amendment guarantees citizenship for nearly all individuals born in the United States, provided that their parents are foreign citizens, have permanent domicile status in the United States, and are engaging in business in the United States except performing in a diplomatic or official capacity of a foreign power.

Most constitutional scholars agree that the 14th Amendment of the U.S. Constitution provides birthright citizenship even to those born in the United States to illegal immigrants. In Plyler v. Doe, 457 U.S. 202 (1982), (Note: Text of Plyler v. Doe, 457 U.S. 202 (1982) is available from: Cornell Google Scholar Internet Archive (docket files) Justia Library of Congress Oyez (oral argument audio)) a case involving educational entitlements for children in the United States unlawfully, Justice Brennan, writing for a five-to-four majority, held that such persons were subject to the jurisdiction of the United States and thus protected by its laws. In a footnote, he observed, "no plausible distinction with respect to Fourteenth Amendment 'jurisdiction' can be drawn between resident immigrants whose entry into the United States was lawful, and resident immigrants whose entry was unlawful." In 2006, Judge James Chiun-Yue Ho, who President Donald Trump would later appoint to the United States Court of Appeals for the Fifth Circuit, wrote in a law review article that with the Plyler decision "any doubt was put to rest" whether the 1898 Wong Kim Ark decision applied to illegal aliens because "all nine justices agreed that the Equal Protection Clause protects legal and illegal aliens alike. And all nine reached that conclusion precisely because illegal aliens are 'subject to the jurisdiction' of the U.S., no less than legal aliens and U.S. citizens."

In 2010, statistics showed that a significant, and rising, number of undocumented immigrants were having children in the United States, but there is mixed evidence that acquiring citizenship for the parents was their goal. According to PolitiFact, the immigration benefits of having a child born in the United States are limited. Citizen children cannot sponsor parents for entry into the country until they are 21 years of age, and if the parent had ever been in the country illegally, they would have to show they had left and not returned for at least ten years; however, pregnant and nursing mothers could receive food vouchers through the federal WIC (Women, Infants and Children) program and enroll the children in Medicaid.

Parents of citizen children who have been in the country for ten years or more can also apply for relief from deportation, though only 4,000 persons a year can receive relief status; as such, according to PolitiFact, having a child in order to gain citizenship for the parents is "an extremely long-term, and uncertain, process." Approximately 88,000 legal-resident parents of US citizen children were deported in the 2000s, most for minor criminal convictions.

== Incidence ==
Some critics of illegal immigration claim the United States' "birthright citizenship" is an incentive for illegal immigration, and that immigrants come to the country to give birth specifically so that their child will be an American citizen. The majority of children of illegal immigrants in the United States are citizens, and the number has risen. According to a Pew Hispanic Center report, an estimated 73% of children of illegal immigrants were citizens in 2008, up from 63% in 2003. A total of 3.8 million illegal immigrants had at least one child who is an American citizen. In investigating a claim by U.S. senator Lindsey Graham, PolitiFact found mixed evidence to support the idea that citizenship was the motivating factor. PolitiFact concludes that "[t]he data suggests that the motivator for illegal immigrants is the search for work and a better economic standing over the long term, not quickie citizenship for U.S.-born babies."

There has been a growing trend, especially amongst Asian and African visitors from China, South Korea, Taiwan and Nigeria to the United States, to make use of "Birth Hotels" to secure US citizenship for their child and leave open the possibility of future immigration by the parents to the United States. The U.S. government estimates that there were 7,462 births to foreign residents in 2008 while the Center for Immigration Studies estimates that 40,000 births are born to "birth tourists" annually. Pregnant women typically spend around $20,000 to stay in the facilities during their final months of pregnancy and an additional month to recuperate and await their new baby's U.S. passport. In some cases, the birth of a Canadian or American child to mainland Chinese parents was a means to circumvent the one-child policy in China; Hong Kong and the Northern Mariana Islands were also popular destinations before more restrictive local regulation impeded traffic. Some prospective mothers misrepresent their intentions of coming to the United States, a violation of U.S. immigration law and as of January 24, 2020 it became U.S. consular policy to deny B visa applications from applicants whom the consular officer has reason to believe are traveling for the primary purpose of giving birth in the United States to obtain U.S. citizenship for their child.

Examples of people who were born in the United States before either of their parents became citizens include past presidential candidates Bobby Jindall, Nikki Haley, Kamala Harris, and Marco Rubio; see Natural-born-citizen clause (United States) § Eligibility challenges.

== See also ==
- Family reunification
- United States nationality law
- Anchor babies in Hong Kong
