= How to Have an American Baby =

2023 documentary film

How to Have an American Baby is a 2023 documentary film which explores the Chinese birth tourism industry in the United States.
