= Chadian passport =

Passport issued to citizens of Chad

- The front cover of a Chadian passport
- Type: Passport
- Issued by: Chad
- Purpose: Identification
- Eligibility: Chadian citizenship

The Chadian passport is issued to citizens of Chad for international travel. The Chadian passport is written in three languages; French, English and Arabic.

As of 1 January 2017, Chadian citizens had visa-free or visa on arrival access to 51 countries and territories, ranking the Chadian passport 85th in terms of travel freedom (tied with Bhutanese, Chinese, Malian and Rwandan passports) according to the Henley Passport Index.

On 24 September 2017, citizens of Chad who held Chadian passports were banned from entering the United States of America. The reason was that Chadian authorities had run out of passport paper and were unable to submit sample passports to American authorities.

== See also ==
- Visa requirements for Chadian citizens
