= Tuvaluan passport =

Passport issued to Tuvaluan citizens

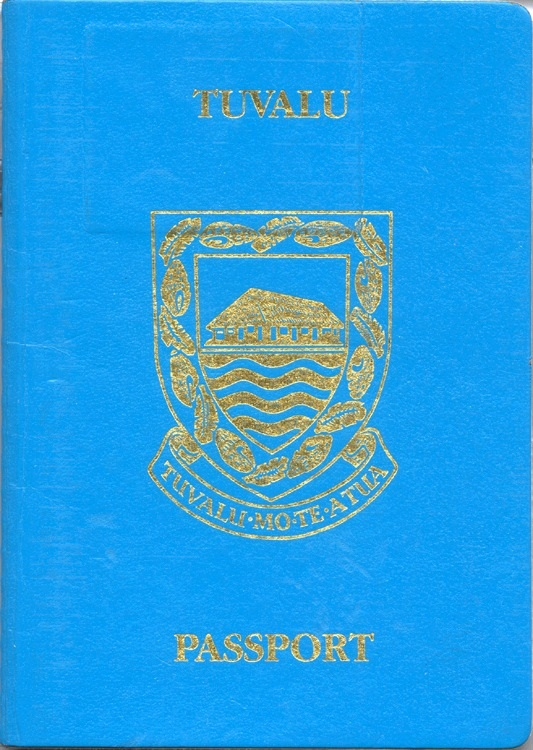
- The front cover of a Tuvaluan Passport
- Type: Passport
- Issued by: Tuvalu
- Purpose: Identification
- Eligibility: Tuvaluan citizenship law
- Expiration: 5 years

The Tuvaluan passport is an international travel document that is issued to Tuvaluan citizens subject to Tuvaluan nationality law.

== History ==
Prior to independence, whilst a member of the Gilbert and Ellice Islands, Tuvaluans were considered a citizen of the United Kingdom and Colonies (British subject). After independence, in 1979, the Parliament of Tuvalu passed the Passports Act which created a separate Tuvaluan passport for their citizens for identity and travel purposes due to most losing their British subject status.

As of 1 July 2019, Tuvaluan citizens had visa-free or visa on arrival access to 126 countries and territories, ranking the Tuvaluan passport 44th in terms of travel freedom (tied with the Nicaraguan and Ukrainian passports) according to the Henley visa restrictions index. Tuvalu signed a mutual visa waiver agreement with Schengen Area countries on 1 July 2016.

In 1997, Tuvalu sold passports on the assumption there would be high demand from those in the People's Republic of China and British Hong Kong, with the Tuvaluan government expecting annual revenues of $7.3 million. However, the predicted demand did not arise and after only earning $500,000 over two years, the scheme was cancelled after strong internal opposition. A citizenship by investment scheme was proposed in 2021 but it was dropped due to opposition, including from the former Prime Minister of Tuvalu, Enele Sopoaga.

== Design ==
All Tuvaluan passports are issued in the name of the Tuvaluan monarch. The first page of a Tuvaluan passport reads:

"The Governor-General of Tuvalu hereby requests and requires in the name of the Sovereign of Tuvalu all those whom it may concern to allow the holder of this passport to pass freely, without hindrance or delay, and in case of need to give the holder all lawful aid and protection. The holder of this passport has the right to enter and reside in Tuvalu."

== See also ==
- Visa requirements for Tuvaluan citizens

== Bibliography ==
- Passports Act
- Passports Regulations
