= Articles 2 and 3 of the Constitution of Ireland =

Laws regarding Irish nationality

Article 2 and Article 3 of the Constitution of Ireland (Irish: Bunreacht na hÉireann) were adopted with the Constitution of Ireland as a whole on 29 December 1937, but revised completely by means of the Nineteenth Amendment which became effective 2 December 1999. As amended, they grant the right to be "part of the Irish Nation" to all those people born on the island of Ireland; the articles also express a desire for the peaceful political unification of the island subject to the consent of the people of Northern Ireland and Republic of Ireland. Before 1999, Articles 2 and 3 made the claim that the whole island formed one "national territory".

== Current version ==
The Irish Government was bound by the terms of the 1998 Good Friday Agreement to submit Articles 2 and 3 to amendment by referendum. As a result, the Nineteenth Amendment of the Constitution was adopted during June of the same year by 94% of those voting. The new wording describes the Irish nation as a community of individuals with a common identity rather than as a territory, and is intended to reassure unionists that a united Ireland will not happen without the consent of a majority of the Northern Ireland electorate.

=== Full text ===
==== Article 2 ====
It is the entitlement and birthright of every person born in the island of Ireland, which includes its islands and seas, to be part of the Irish Nation. That is also the entitlement of all persons otherwise qualified in accordance with law to be citizens of Ireland. Furthermore, the Irish nation cherishes its special affinity with people of Irish ancestry living abroad who share its cultural identity and heritage.

==== Article 3 ====
1. It is the firm will of the Irish Nation, in harmony and friendship, to unite all the people who share the territory of the island of Ireland, in all the diversity of their identities and traditions, recognising that a united Ireland shall be brought about only by peaceful means with the consent of a majority of the people, democratically expressed, in both jurisdictions in the island. Until then, the laws enacted by the Parliament established by this Constitution shall have the like area and extent of application as the laws enacted by the Parliament (Note: The parliament of the Irish Free State (1922–1937). The Good Friday Agreement does not refer to the part of the island of Ireland that is not Northern Ireland by name.) that existed immediately before the coming into operation of this Constitution.
2. Institutions with executive powers and functions that are shared between those jurisdictions may be established by their respective responsible authorities for stated purposes and may exercise powers and functions in respect of all or any part of the island.

=== Article 2 ===
As amended, Article 2 provides that everyone born on the island of Ireland has the right to be a part of the 'Irish Nation'. The apparent intention is partly to allow the people of Northern Ireland, if they wish, to feel included in the 'nation' without making what might be perceived as a revanchist claim. However, it has been argued that "the new Article 2 of the Irish constitution gave northern nationalists nothing". After all, Article 9 of the Constitution of Ireland governs Irish citizenship. It provides that the "future loss and acquisition of Irish nationality and citizenship shall be determined in accordance with law". Since it was further amended during 2004, Article 9 now also provides that "[n]otwithstanding any other provision of this Constitution, a person born in the island of Ireland, which includes its islands and seas, who does not have, at the time of the birth of that person, at least one parent who is an Irish citizen or entitled to be an Irish citizen is not entitled to Irish citizenship or nationality, unless provided for by law".

The changes to Article 2 represent a strictly qualified provision of the Belfast Agreement recognizing:

the birthright of all the people of Northern Ireland to identify themselves and be accepted as Irish or British, or both, as they may so choose, and accordingly confirm that their right to hold both British and Irish citizenship is accepted by both Governments and would not be affected by any future change in the status of Northern Ireland.

The qualification to that provision of the Belfast Agreement is contained in Annex 2 to the Belfast Agreement. That Annex specifies that the above-mentioned reference to "the people of Northern Ireland" only means "all persons born in Northern Ireland and having, at the time of their birth, at least one parent who is a British citizen, an Irish citizen or is otherwise entitled to reside in Northern Ireland without any restriction on their period of residence." Accordingly, the Belfast Agreement did not bind either state to provide for any unqualified entitlement to birthright citizenship.

Article 2 further recognises the "special affinity" between the people of Ireland and the Irish diaspora.

A criticism of the new wording was that the logic of the constitution was disrupted by the new Articles 2 and 3, in particular as Article 9 already dealt with citizenship, and that the references to "Irish nation" in the new Articles do not have any practical meaning.

=== Article 3 ===
As amended, Article 3, Section 1 expresses the "firm will" of the Irish nation to create a united Irish people, though not, explicitly, a united country. It stresses, however, that a united Ireland should respect the distinct cultural identity of Unionists and that it should only happen with the separate "democratically expressed" consent of the peoples of both parts of the island. This provision was intended to diminish the concerns of Unionists, that their rights would be ignored in a united Ireland, should that happen. By the Good Friday Agreement the people of Northern Ireland's "democratically expressed" consent must be secured by referendum. For a provision that states the "Irish Nation"'s desire for unity, it adds an additional legal requirement for a referendum to be held not only in Northern Ireland but also in the Republic of Ireland before a united Ireland could be brought about. This has the effect of creating an extra hurdle to Irish acceptance of a cession of Northern Ireland's territory from the UK which would not apply to a cession of any other territory.

Section 2 allows Ireland to participate in the cross-border 'implementation' bodies established by the Agreement.

== Original version ==
=== Full text ===
==== Article 2 ====
The national territory consists of the whole island of Ireland, its islands and the territorial seas.

==== Article 3 ====
Pending the re-integration of the national territory, and without prejudice to the right of the parliament and government established by this constitution to exercise jurisdiction over the whole territory, the laws enacted by the parliament shall have the like area and extent of application as the laws of Saorstát Éireann and the like extra-territorial effect.

Saorstát Éireann is the Irish-language translation of Irish Free State, the name of the independent Irish state before 1937.

Speaking at the 1916 Easter Rising commemoration at Arbour Hill in Dublin during 1998, Taoiseach Bertie Ahern said:

The British Government are effectively out of the equation and neither the British parliament nor people have any legal right under this agreement to impede the achievement of Irish unity if it had the consent of the people North and South... Our nation is and always will be a 32-county nation. Antrim and Down are, and will remain, as much a part of Ireland as any southern county.

Speaking to the Northern Ireland Forum on 17 April 1998 Ulster Unionist Party politician David Trimble said:

The illegal territorial claim to Northern Ireland in Articles 2 and 3 of the Irish Constitution has been removed and the South now accepts the legitimacy of Northern Ireland.

== History ==
The drafters of the Constitution of Ireland during 1937 considered the partition of Ireland by the Government of Ireland Act 1920, and Northern Ireland's Opt Out of the Free State by the 1921 Anglo-Irish Treaty, to be illegitimate. They desired the new constitution to proclaim the existence of a single 'Irish nation', and the theoretical right of the state to encompass the whole island, while for reasons of pragmatism recognising the de facto reality of partition, which resulted in delicate wording.

The Constitution refers to two separate entities: a nation, encompassing the whole island of Ireland, and a state, extending, for the time being, only to the twenty-six counties of the 'South'. In its 1937 form, Article 2 described the island of Ireland as the "national territory". Article 3, however, stated that the laws of the southern state would apply only to the South. The purpose of Article 3 was to clarify that Article 2 was intended largely as a kind of declaration, rather than as a provision that would have actual force of law.

=== Controversy ===
Until their amendment during 1999 Articles 2 and 3 were the subject of some controversy, particularly among Unionists in Northern Ireland. To Northern Ireland Unionists the articles were a hostile claim upon their territory, and a declaration that they might be coerced into a united Ireland without their consent, and in violation of the sovereignty of the United Kingdom. Furthermore, they claimed, the articles constituted an extraterritorial claim to a part of a foreign nation and were therefore in violation of international law.

For many decades the correct interpretation of the articles also caused some controversy among Irish nationalists. Some considered the constitution as placing an enforceable legal obligation on the government of the Republic to use its influence to actively seek the unification of the island. Invoking Article 2, some Northern Ireland nationalists elected to the UK parliament requested, but were denied, the right to be recognised in the southern parliament (the Oireachtas) as TDs (members of Dáil Éireann). Before 1999, however, the Irish Supreme Court affirmed in consistent rulings that Article 2 created no rights or obligations that were actually enforceable in a court of law.

After the signing of the Anglo-Irish Agreement of 1985, unionist politicians Christopher and Michael McGimpsey brought a suit against the Irish government in the High Court arguing that the Agreement was unconstitutional by Articles 2 and 3, because it recognised that Northern Ireland was part of the United Kingdom. This argument was unusual coming from unionists because of the traditional unionist opposition to these two articles, but was done to discredit an agreement they opposed, albeit not for the reasons they opposed it. Their case failed in the High Court, and again on appeal to the Supreme Court.

=== Adoption of new versions of the Articles ===
At midnight on 1 December 1999, the direct rule of the UK parliament ended in Northern Ireland when power was formally devolved to the new Northern Ireland Assembly. On 2 December 1999, power was devolved to the North/South Ministerial Council and the British–Irish Council when commencement orders for the British–Irish Agreement came into effect. However, Article 4(2) of the British–Irish Agreement (the Agreement between the British and Irish governments for the implementation of the Belfast Agreement) required the two governments to notify each other in writing of the completion of the requirements for the entry into force of the Belfast Agreement. Entry into force was to be upon the receipt of the later of the two notifications. The British government agreed to participate with a televised ceremony at Iveagh House in Dublin, the Irish department of foreign affairs. Peter Mandelson, the Secretary of State for Northern Ireland, attended early on 2 December 1999. He exchanged notifications with David Andrews, the Irish foreign minister. Soon after the ceremony, at 10.30 am, Taoiseach Bertie Ahern signed the declaration formally amending Articles 2 and 3 of the Irish Constitution. He then announced to the Dáil that the British–Irish Agreement had become effective (including certain supplementary agreements concerning the Belfast Agreement).

=== Citizenship law ===
By granting an unqualified right to citizenship to all of those born on the island of Ireland, the new articles have also caused further controversy in the Republic. In January 2003, the Supreme Court ruled that it was constitutional for the Government to deport the parents of children who were Irish citizens. In October 2004 the European Court of Justice ruled (in the Chen case) that a mother who is neither a UK nor an Irish citizen, whose child was born in Northern Ireland and had subsequently (as was the child's entitlement) acquired Irish citizenship, had the right to live with her child in the UK, since denying this would in effect deny residence to the child, in violation of her rights as a citizen. The ECJ ruling acknowledged that, under certain circumstances, a person born in part of the UK (i.e. Northern Ireland) could not gain citizenship of that nation state, but could gain Irish citizenship, without having ever set foot in the Republic of Ireland, or having any connection with it.

The Twenty-seventh Amendment was approved by referendum on 11 June 2004, and was enacted on 24 June. It inserted a new section in Article 9 of the constitution stating that, "notwithstanding any other provision of [the] Constitution", no-one would be automatically entitled to Irish citizenship unless they had at least one parent who was (or was entitled to be) an Irish citizen. The Irish Nationality and Citizenship Act 2004 amended citizenship law to remove the entitlement to citizenship from those born on the island of Ireland who did not have an Irish-citizen parent, or whose parents had not lived in Ireland for three of the previous four years. This law was commenced on 1 January 2005.
