= Visa policy of Chad =

Policy on permits required to enter Chad

Visitors to Chad must obtain either an electronic visa online or a regular visa in advance, unless if they are a national of one of the visa-exempt countries.

== Visa policy map ==
Visa policy of Chad Chad Visa-free for up to 90 days and may enter using ID card Visa-free for up to 90 days eVisa Admission restricted

== Visa exemption ==
According to the Directorate of Emigration and Immigration of Chad and Timatic, nationals of the following countries and territories may enter Chad without a visa for the period listed below:

90 days

- Barbados^{1}
- Benin
- Bermuda^{1}
- Burkina Faso
- Cameroon^{ID} ^{2}
- Central African Republic^{ID}
- Congo Republic^{ID}
- Cook Islands^{1}
- Côte d'Ivoire^{2}
- Dominica^{1}
- Equatorial Guinea
- Gabon^{ID}
- Mali
- Micronesia^{1}
- Mauritania^{2}
- Niger
- Nigeria
- Rwanda
- Saint Vincent and the Grenadines^{1}
- Senegal^{2}
- Singapore^{1}
- Suriname^{1}
- Togo
- United Arab Emirates^{2}

_{ID — May enter Chad using an ID card in lieu of a passport.}
_{1 — Not listed by Timatic as being visa-exempt.}
_{2 — Not listed by the Directorate of Emigration and Immigration of Chad as being visa-exempt.}

Date of visa changes
- 8 August 2017: CEMAC - Equatorial Guinea
- 26 October 2017: United Arab Emirates
- 11 December 2024: Barbados, Benin, Bermuda, Burundi, Democratic Republic of Congo, Dominica, Gambia, Haiti, Hong Kong, Malaysia, Mauritius, Micronesia, Philippines, Saint Vincent and the Grenadines, Singapore and Suriname
- June 2026: Burkina Faso (resumed), Cook Islands, Equatorial Guinea (resumed), Haiti (resumed), Malaysia (resumed), Mauritius (resumed), Philippines (resumed), Togo (resumed)
- October 2026: Cameroon (resumed)

Cancelled

- 11 December 2024: Burkina Faso, Equatorial Guinea, Mauritania, Senegal, Togo and the United Arab Emirates, which were previously visa-exempt, were not included in the visa exemption list on the Chad eVisa portal.
- October 2025: Philippines
- November 2025: Hong Kong, Mauritius
- February 2026: Democratic Republic of Congo, Haiti, Malaysia
- July 2026: Burkina Faso, Haiti, Philippines
- September 2026: Cameroon, Mauritius
- October 2026: Cameroon, Gambia, Malaysia

- In addition, holders of diplomatic passports issued to nationals of Comoros, Djibouti, Egypt, Eritrea, Gambia, Ghana, Guinea, Guinea-Bissau, Kenya, Liberia, Libya, Mali, Morocco, São Tomé and Príncipe, Sierra Leone, Somalia, Sudan, Tunisia, Turkey and United Arab Emirates can visit Chad without a visa for up to 90 days (unless otherwise stated).

== E-Visa ==
In August 2019 Chad announced a plan to introduce an e-Visa. The Government plans to launch the system in September 2019.

On 11 December 2024, the Chad e-Visa system was launched.

Nationals of visa exempt countries cannot apply for an eVisa. Timatic is still not updated.

== Transit ==
Transit without visa is allowed for travelers continuing their trip within 48 hours by the same or first connecting plane to a third country without leaving the airport.

== United States ==
On June 5, 2025, Chad has suspended visa issuances to U.S. citizens in response to Donald Trump's travel ban, current visas will still be honored until their expiration.

== Police registration ==
Mandatory police registration is required for all nationalities within 72 hours of arrival.

== See also ==
- Visa requirements for Chadian citizens
