= Visa requirements for Tuvaluan citizens =

Administrative entry restrictions

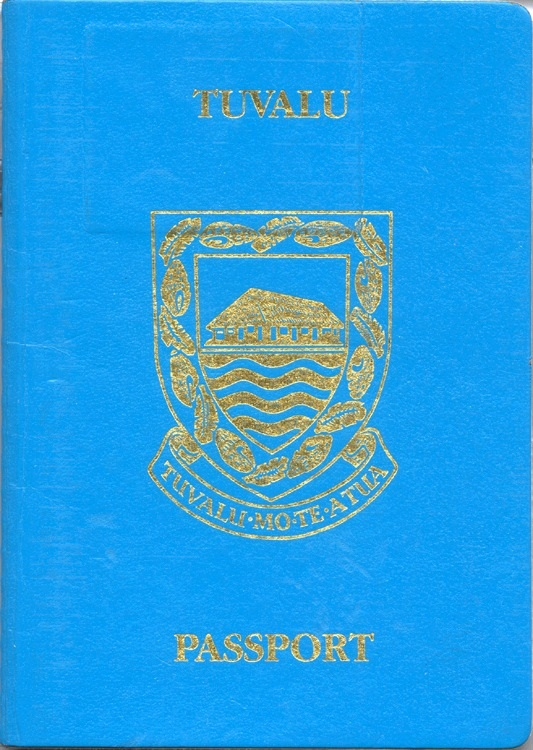
A Tuvaluan passport

Visa requirements for Tuvaluan citizens are administrative entry restrictions by the authorities of other states placed on citizens of Tuvalu. As of 2026, Tuvaluan citizens have visa-free or visa on arrival access to 127 countries and territories, ranking the Tuvaluan passport 36th in terms of travel freedom according to the Henley Passport Index

Tuvalu signed a mutual visa waiver agreement with Schengen Area countries on 1 July 2016.

== Visa requirements map ==
Visa requirements for Tuvaluan citizens Tuvalu Visa not required / ESTA / eTA / eVisitor eVisa Visa available both on arrival or online Visa on arrival Visa required prior to arrival

== Visa requirements ==
Country	Visa requirement	Allowed stay	Notes (excluding departure fees)
Afghanistan	eVisa	30 days	Visa is not required in case born in Afghanistan or can proof that one of their parents is a national of Afghanistan or born in Afghanistan.; e-Visa : Visitors must arrive at Kabul International (KBL).
Albania	eVisa		Visa is not required for Holders of a valid multiple-entry Schengen, UK or US visa has been previously used once or residence permit of Schengen, UK, US or UAE 10 years.
Algeria	Visa required		
Andorra	Visa not required	90 days	
Angola	Visa not required	30 days	
Antigua and Barbuda	Visa not required	180 days	
Argentina	Visa required		A Travel Certificate must be used lieu of a visa and takes approximately 10 working days to issue.; The AVE (High Speed Travel) is open to Tuvaluan citizens holding valid, current ordinary passports traveling to Argentina for tourism. To do so, they must hold a valid category B2/J/B1/O/P (P1-P2-P3)/E/H-1B visa issued by the United States of America.
Armenia	eVisa	120 days	
Australia and territories	Online Visitor e600 Visa		May apply online (Online Visitor e600 visa).; Transit visa is not required.
Austria	Visa not required	90 days	90 days within any 180 day period in the Schengen Area
Azerbaijan	Visa required		
Bahamas	Visa not required	90 days	
Bahrain	eVisa	14 days	
Bangladesh	Visa on arrival	30 days	
Barbados	Visa not required	180 days	
Belarus	Visa required		
Belgium	Visa not required	90 days	90 days within any 180 day period in the Schengen Area
Belize	Visa not required		
Benin	eVisa	30 days	Must have an international vaccination certificate.
Bhutan	eVisa	90 days	Visa fee is 40 USD per person and visa application may be processed within 5 business days with duration of stay of 90 days.; e-Visa applicant is also subject to pay Sustainable Development Fee
Bolivia	eVisa / Visa on arrival	90 days	
Bosnia and Herzegovina	Visa not required	90 days	
Botswana	Visa not required	3 months	
Brazil	Visa required		
Brunei	Visa required		
Bulgaria	Visa not required	90 days	90 days within any 180 day period
Burkina Faso	eVisa		
Burundi	Visa on arrival	30 days	May Apply online
Cambodia	eVisa / Visa on arrival	30 days	
Cameroon	eVisa		
Canada	Visa required		
Cape Verde	Visa on arrival	30 days	Visa on arrival at Sal, Boa Vista, São Vicente or Santiago international airports.; Requirement to register online 5 days before arrival; Also pay the airport security fee of CVE 3400 either online or on arrival.
Central African Republic	Visa required		
Chad	eVisa	90 days	
Chile	Visa required		
China	Visa required		
Colombia	eVisa	90 days	
Comoros	Visa on arrival	45 days	
Republic of the Congo	Visa required		
Democratic Republic of the Congo	eVisa	7 days	
Costa Rica	Visa not required	30 days	
Côte d'Ivoire	eVisa		e-Visa holders must arrive via Port Bouet Airport.
Croatia	Visa not required	90 days	90 days within any 180 day period in the Schengen Area
Cuba	eVisa	90 days	
Cyprus	Visa not required	90 days	90 days within any 180 day period
Czech Republic	Visa not required	90 days	90 days within any 180 day period in the Schengen Area
Denmark	Visa not required	90 days	90 days within any 180 day period in the Schengen Area
Djibouti	eVisa	31 days	
Dominica	Visa not required	6 months	
Dominican Republic	Visa not required	30 days	
Ecuador	Visa not required	90 days	
Egypt	Visa on arrival	30 days	Conditions apply.
El Salvador	Visa not required	90 days	
Equatorial Guinea	eVisa		
Eritrea	Visa required		
Estonia	Visa not required	90 days	90 days within any 180 day period in the Schengen Area
Eswatini	Visa not required	30 days	
Ethiopia	eVisa	up to 90 days	eVisa holders must arrive via Addis Ababa Bole International Airport
Fiji	Visa not required	4 months	
Finland	Visa not required	90 days	90 days within any 180 day period in the Schengen Area
France	Visa not required	90 days	90 days within any 180 day period in the Schengen Area; Also visa-free for New Caledonia, Wallis and Futuna and French Polynesia.
Gabon	eVisa	90 days	
Gambia	Visa not required	90 days	
Georgia	eVisa	90 days	
Germany	Visa not required	90 days	90 days within any 180 day period in the Schengen Area
Ghana	Visa required		
Greece	Visa not required	90 days	90 days within any 180 day period in the Schengen Area
Grenada	Visa not required	3 months	
Guatemala	Visa not required	90 days	
Guinea	eVisa	90 days	
Guinea-Bissau	Visa on arrival	90 days	
Guyana	Visa required		
Haiti	Visa not required	90 days	
Honduras	Visa not required	3 months	
Hungary	Visa not required	90 days	90 days within any 180 day period in the Schengen Area
Iceland	Visa not required	90 days	90 days within any 180 day period in the Schengen Area
India	e-Visa	60 days	e-Visa holders must arrive via 32 designated airports (Note: Ahmedabad; Amritsar; Bagdogra; Bengaluru; Bhubaneswar; Chandigarh; Chennai; Coimbatore; Delhi; Gaya; Goa-Dabolim; Goa-Manohar; Guwahati; Hyderabad; Indore; Jaipur; Kannur; Kochi; Kolkata; Kozhikode; Lucknow; Madurai; Mangaluru; Mumbai; Nagpur; Port Blair; Pune; Surat; Thiruvananthapuram; Tiruchirappalli; Varanasi; Visakhapatnam) or 5 designated seaports. (Note: Chennai; Cochin; Mormugao (Goa); Mumbai; Mangalore); An Indian e-Tourist Visa may only be obtained twice within 1 calendar year.; Foreigners of Pakistani origin or who hold a Pakistani Passport are not eligible for an e-Visa. Foreigners who are not Pakistani nationals, but whose parents or grandparents (either paternal or maternal) were born in, or were permanent residents in Pakistan, are also not eligible for an e-Visa.
Indonesia	Visa required		
Iran	eVisa /Visa on arrival	30 days	Conditions apply.
Iraq	e-Visa		
Ireland	Visa not required		
Israel	Visa required		
Italy	Visa not required	90 days	90 days within any 180 day period in the Schengen Area
Jamaica	Visa not required		
Japan	eVisa		eVisa is eligible online.; Eligible for an e-Visa if residing in one these countries Australia, Brazil, Cambodia, Canada, India, Saudi Arabia, Singapore, South Africa, Taiwan, United Arab Emirates, United Kingdom, United States.; May apply online
Jordan	eVisa / Visa on arrival	3 months	
Kazakhstan	eVisa		
Kenya	Electronic Travel Authorisation	3 months	Electronic Travel Authorisation (eTA); Applications can be submitted up to 90 days prior to travel and must be submitted at least 3 days in advance.; eTA fee is USD 32.50.; eTA is good for single entry, but visitors who leave Kenya to other EAC countries may re-enter provided that their eTA is still valid; Proof of reservation at the hotel where visitors plan to stay is required (if staying with friends, an invitation letter is also acceptable).; Yellow fever vaccination certificate is required if coming from endemic countries.; Can also be entered on an East Africa tourist visa issued by Rwanda or Uganda.
Kiribati	Visa not required	30 days	
North Korea	Visa required		
South Korea	Visa not required	30 days	
Kuwait	Visa required		e-Visa can be obtained for holders of a Residence Permit issued by a GCC member state under the following conditions: To be 18 years old and over.; The residence permit for a GCC state must be valid for at least another 3 months.; To be accompanied by the sponsor of the residence permit if the sponsor is an individual.; Does not apply to holders of a GCC Student Visa and Non-Skilled Worker Visa
Kyrgyzstan	eVisa		
Laos	eVisa / Visa on arrival	30 days	18 (Note: Savannakhet Airport; Lanetoui - Mengkang (China); Meuangmom - Wan Pong (Myanmar); Banvang - Ban Khok Phai (Thailand); Namngeun - Huay Kon (Thailand); Paksan - Bueng Kan (Thailand); Paktaphan - Pak Saeng (Thailand); Pangmon - Ban Huak (Thailand); Phoudou (Thailand); Dak ta ock - Nam Giang (Vietnam); La Lai (Vietnam); Namkan (Vietnam); Namphao - Cau Treo (Vietnam); Namsoy - Na Meo (Vietnam); Naphao - Cha Lo (Vietnam); Pahang - Long Sap (Vietnam); Panghok - Tây Trang (Vietnam); Phoukeua - Bo Y (Vietnam)) of the 33 border crossings are only open to regular visa holders.; e-Visa may be used to enter Laos through the Luang Prabang, Pakse and Vientiane international airports, 3 Thai-Lao Friendship Bridges (Note: Vientiane (Friendship Bridge 1); Savannakhet (Friendship Bridge 2); Bokeo (Friendship Bridge 4)), in Boten (road and railroad), and in Vientiane (at Khamsavath railway station).; Visa on arrival is available at the Luang Prabang, Pakse and Vientiane international airports, 4 Thai-Lao Friendship Bridges (Note: Vientiane (Friendship Bridge 1); Savannakhet (Friendship Bridge 2); Khammouane (Friendship Bridge 3); Bokeo (Friendship Bridge 4)) and 7 border crossings. (Note: Nongnokkheane - Trapeang Kriel (Cambodia); Boten - Bo han (China); Golden Triangle/Samliemkham (Thailand); Khamsavath railway station (Thailand); Namheuang - Ban Na Kraseng (Thailand); Vang tao - Chongmek (Thailand); Dansavan - Lao Bảo (Vietnam))
Latvia	Visa not required	90 days	90 days within any 180 day period in the Schengen Area
Lebanon	Visa required		
Lesotho	Visa not required	90 days	
Liberia	eVisa		
Libya	eVisa		
Liechtenstein	Visa not required	90 days	90 days within any 180 day period in the Schengen Area
Lithuania	Visa not required	90 days	90 days within any 180 day period in the Schengen Area
Luxembourg	Visa not required	90 days	90 days within any 180 day period in the Schengen Area
Madagascar	eVisa / Visa on arrival	90 days	
Malawi	Visa not required	90 days	
Malaysia	Visa not required	30 days	
Maldives	Free Visa on arrival	30 days	
Mali	Visa required		
Malta	Visa not required	90 days	90 days within any 180 day period in the Schengen Area
Marshall Islands	Visa on arrival	90 days	
Mauritania	eVisa	30 days	
Mauritius	Visa not required	90 days	
Mexico	Visa required		Visa is not required for Holders of a valid visa of Canada, US, UK or a Schengen State and Permanent residence of Canada, Chile, Colombia, Schengen State, Japan, UK, US; Entry may be refused by immigration officials for individuals who were previously denied a US visa, even if holding a valid Mexican visa.
Micronesia	Visa not required	30 days	
Moldova	Visa not required	90 days	90 days within any 180 day period
Monaco	Visa not required		
Mongolia	eVisa	30 days	
Montenegro	Visa not required	90 days	
Morocco	Visa required		
Mozambique	eVisa / Visa on arrival	30 days	
Myanmar	Visa required		
Namibia	eVisa		
Nauru	Visa on arrival	90 days	
Nepal	eVisa / Visa on arrival	90 days	
Netherlands	Visa not required	90 days	90 days within any 180 day period in the Schengen Area
New Zealand	Visa required		International Visitor Conservation and Tourism Levy not required.; May transit without visa if transit is through Auckland Airport and for no longer than 24 hours, subject to meeting character requirements and obtaining an Electronic Travel Authority prior to departure.; Holders of an Australian Permanent Resident Visa or Resident Return Visa may be granted a New Zealand Resident Visa on arrival permitting indefinite stay (pursuant to the Trans-Tasman Travel Arrangement), subject to meeting character requirements and obtaining an Electronic Travel Authority prior to departure.
Nicaragua	Visa not required	90 days	
Niger	Visa required		
Nigeria	eVisa	90 days	
North Macedonia	Visa required		Visa is not required for stays upto 15 days if holding a valid multiple entry visa of Canada, the United States, United Kingdom, Schengen Area member state, or residence permit of Schengen Area member state.
Norway	Visa not required	90 days	90 days within any 180 day period in the Schengen Area
Oman	Visa required		Holders of a GCC state resident permit can get a 28 days visa on arrival that costs 5 Omani Riyals.
Pakistan	Online Visa		Online Visa eligible.
Palau	Free Visa on arrival	30 days	
Panama	Visa not required	180 days	
Papua New Guinea	eVisa / Free visa on arrival	60 days	
Paraguay	Visa required		
Peru	Visa not required	183 days	
Philippines	Visa not required	30 days	
Poland	Visa not required	90 days	90 days within any 180 day period in the Schengen Area
Portugal	Visa not required	90 days	90 days within any 180 day period in the Schengen Area
Qatar	eVisa		
Romania	Visa not required	90 days	90 days within any 180 day period
Russia	Visa required		
Rwanda	eVisa	30 days	May apply online.; Can also be entered on an East Africa tourist visa issued by Kenya or Uganda
Saint Kitts and Nevis	Electronic Travel Authorisation	90 days	
Saint Lucia	Visa not required	6 weeks	
Saint Vincent and the Grenadines	Visa not required	1 month	
Samoa	Visa not required	60 days	
San Marino	Visa not required		
São Tomé and Príncipe	eVisa		
Saudi Arabia	Visa required		Tourist visa on arrival for holders of a valid multiple entry visa from US, UK or Schengen area, under the condition that the multiple entry visa has been used at least once, proving that by showing the entry and exit stamps of the country of issuance.
Senegal	Visa on arrival	90 days	
Serbia	Visa required		
Seychelles	Free Visitor's Permit on arrival	3 months	
Sierra Leone	eVisa / Visa on arrival		
Singapore	Visa not required	30 days	
Slovakia	Visa not required	90 days	90 days within any 180 day period in the Schengen Area
Slovenia	Visa not required	90 days	90 days within any 180 day period in the Schengen Area
Solomon Islands	Free Visitor's Permit on arrival	45 days	
Somalia	eVisa	30 days	
South Africa	Visa required		
South Sudan	eVisa		Obtainable online; Printed visa authorization must be presented at the time of travel
Spain	Visa not required	90 days	90 days within any 180 day period in the Schengen Area
Sri Lanka	ETA / Visa on arrival	30 days	Electronic Travel Authorization can also be obtained on arrival.; 30 days extendable to 6 months.; The standard visitor visa allows a stay of 60 days within any 6-month period.; Visa fees (for Standard visitor visa): SAARC - USD 35; Non SAARC - USD 75; e-Visa categories will be charged an additional USD 18.50 service fee.; If transiting from any of the Sri Lankan airports, An e-Visa is exempted (2 day transit period).
Sudan	Visa required		
Suriname	eVisa		
Sweden	Visa not required	90 days	90 days within any 180 day period in the Schengen Area
Switzerland	Visa not required	90 days	90 days within any 180 day period in the Schengen Area
Syria	eVisa		
Tajikistan	Visa required		
Tanzania	Visa not required	3 months	
Thailand	eVisa		
Timor-Leste	Visa on arrival	30 days	At Presidente Nicolau Lobato International Airport or the Dili Sea Port only.
Togo	eVisa	15 days	
Tonga	Visa on arrival	31 days	
Trinidad and Tobago	Visa not required		
Tunisia	Visa required		
Turkey	Visa required		
Turkmenistan	Visa required		
Uganda	eVisa	3 months	May apply online.
Ukraine	eVisa	30 days	
United Arab Emirates	eVisa	30 days	May apply online.; May apply also using 'Smart service'.
United Kingdom	Electronic Travel Authorisation	6 months	
United States	Visa required		
Uruguay	Visa required		
Uzbekistan	Visa required		
Vanuatu	Visa not required	120 days	
Vatican City	Visa not required	90 days	Open borders but de facto follows Italian visa policy.
Venezuela	eVisa		Introduction of Electronic Visa System for Tourist and Business Travelers.
Vietnam	eVisa	90 days	Visa free for 30 days when visiting Phú Quốc
Yemen	Visa required		
Zambia	Visa not required	90 days	
Zimbabwe	Visa not required	3 months	

=== Dependent, disputed, and restricted territories ===
Unrecognised or partially recognised countries

Territory	Conditions of access	Notes
Abkhazia	Visa not required	90 days
Kosovo	Visa not required	90 days
Northern Cyprus	Visa not required	
Sahrawi Arab Democratic Republic		Undefined visa regime in the Western Sahara controlled territory.
Palestine	Visa not required	Arrival by sea to Gaza Strip not allowed.
Somaliland	Visa on arrival	30 days for 30 US dollars, payable on arrival.
South Ossetia	Visa not required	Multiple entry visa to Russia and three day prior notification are required to enter South Ossetia.
Taiwan	Visa not required	90 days; Holders of Tuvaluan passport with "place of birth" recorded on the passport data page as Afghanistan, mainland China, Iran, Iraq, Libya, Nigeria, Pakistan, Syria and Yemen are ineligible for the visa exemption and must obtain a visa.
Transnistria	Visa not required	Registration required after 24h.

Dependent and autonomous territories

Territory	Conditions of access	Notes
China
Hong Kong	Visa not required	90 days
Macau	Visa on arrival	30 days
Denmark
Faroe Islands	Visa not required	
Greenland	Visa not required	
France
French Guiana	Visa required	
French Polynesia	Visa not required	
(France) French West Indies	Visa required	Visa free for overseas departments of Guadeloupe and Martinique; Visa required for overseas collectivities of Saint Barthélemy and Saint Martin
Mayotte	Visa required	
New Caledonia	Visa not required	
Réunion	Visa required	
Saint Pierre and Miquelon	Visa required	
Wallis and Futuna	Visa not required	3 months
Netherlands
Aruba	Visa required	
Caribbean Netherlands	Visa required	Includes Bonaire, Sint Eustatius and Saba.
Curaçao	Visa required	
Sint Maarten	Visa required	
New Zealand
Cook Islands	Visa not required	31 days
Niue	Visa not required	30 days
Tokelau	Visa required	
United Kingdom
Akrotiri and Dhekelia	Visa not required	Stays longer than 28 days per 12-month period require a permit.
Anguilla	Visa not required	3 months
Bermuda	Visa not required	
British Indian Ocean Territory	Special permit required	Special permit required.
British Virgin Islands	Visa not required	
Cayman Islands	Visa not required	
Falkland Islands	Visa required	
Gibraltar	Visa not required	
Guernsey	Visa not required	
Isle of Man	Visa not required	
Jersey	Visa not required	
Montserrat	Visa not required	
Pitcairn Islands	Visa not required	14 days visa free and landing fee US$35 or tax of US$5 if not going ashore.
Ascension Island	eVisa	3 months within any year period
Saint Helena	Visitor's Pass required	Visitor's Pass granted on arrival valid for 4/10/21/60/90 days for 12/14/16/20/25 pound sterling.
Tristan da Cunha	Permission required	Permission to land required for 15/30 pounds sterling (yacht/ship passenger) for Tristan da Cunha Island or 20 pounds sterling for Gough Island, Inaccessible Island or Nightingale Islands.
South Georgia and the South Sandwich Islands	Permit required	Pre-arrival permit from the Commissioner required (72 hours/1 month for 110/160 pounds sterling).
Turks and Caicos Islands	Visa required	Holders of a valid visa issued by Canada, United Kingdom or the USA do not require a visa for a maximum stay of 90 days.
United States
American Samoa	Visa required	
Guam	Visa required	
Northern Mariana Islands	Visa required	
Puerto Rico	Visa required	
U.S. Virgin Islands	Visa required	
Antarctica and adjacent islands
Special permits required for Bouvet Island, British Antarctic Territory, French Southern and Antarctic Lands, Argentine Antarctica, (Australia) Australian Antarctic Territory, (Antártica Chilena Province) Chilean Antarctic Territory, (Australia) Heard Island and McDonald Islands, (Norway) Peter I Island, (Norway) Queen Maud Land, (New Zealand) Ross Dependency.

== Non-visa restrictions ==
=== Blank passport pages ===
Many countries require a minimum number of blank pages to be available in the passport being presented, typically one or two pages. Endorsement pages, which often appear after the visa pages, are not counted as being valid or available.

=== Vaccination ===
Cover of the new International Certificate of Vaccination issued by the Bureau of Quarantine in the Philippines since 2021

The African countries of Angola, Benin, Burkina Faso, Burundi, Cameroon, Central African Republic, Democratic Republic of the Congo, Republic of the Congo, Côte d'Ivoire, Gabon, Ghana, Guinea-Bissau, Mali, Niger, Sierra Leone and Togo, South Sudan and Uganda, along with French Guiana in South America, require all incoming passengers older than nine months to one year, to have a current International Certificate of Vaccination or Prophylaxis.

Some other countries require vaccination only if the passenger is coming from an infected area or has visited one recently or has transited for 12 hours in those countries: Algeria, Botswana, Cabo Verde, Chad, Djibouti, Egypt, Eswatini, Ethiopia, Gambia, Ghana, Guinea, Lesotho, Libya, Equatorial Guinea, Eritrea, Madagascar, Malawi, Mauritania, Mauritius, Mozambique, Namibia, Nigeria, Papua New Guinea, Seychelles, Somalia, South Africa, Sudan, Tunisia, Uganda, Tanzania, Zambia and Zimbabwe.

=== Passport validity length ===
Very few countries, such as Paraguay, just require a valid passport on arrival.

However many countries and groupings now require only an identity card – especially from their neighbours. Other countries may have special bilateral arrangements that depart from the generality of their passport validity length policies to shorten the period of passport validity required for each other's citizens or even accept passports that have already expired (but not been cancelled).

Some countries, such as Japan, Ireland and the United Kingdom, require a passport valid throughout the period of the intended stay.

In the absence of specific bilateral agreements, countries requiring passports to be valid for at least 6 more months on arrival include Afghanistan, Algeria, Anguilla, Bahrain, Bhutan, Botswana, British Virgin Islands, Brunei, Cambodia, Cameroon, Cape Verde, Cayman Islands, Central African Republic, Chad, Comoros, Costa Rica, Côte d'Ivoire, Curaçao, Ecuador, Egypt, El Salvador, Equatorial Guinea, Fiji, Gabon, Guinea Bissau, Guyana, Haiti, India, Indonesia, Iran, Iraq, Israel, Jordan, Kenya, Kiribati, Kuwait, Laos, Madagascar, Malaysia, Marshall Islands, Mongolia, Myanmar, Namibia, Nepal, Nicaragua, Nigeria, Oman, Palau, Papua New Guinea, Peru, Philippines, Qatar, Rwanda, Samoa, Saudi Arabia, Singapore, Solomon Islands, Somalia, Sri Lanka, Sudan, Suriname, Tanzania, Thailand, Timor-Leste, Tokelau, Tonga, Turkey, Tuvalu, Uganda, United Arab Emirates, Vanuatu, Venezuela, and Vietnam.

Countries requiring passports valid for at least 4 months on arrival include Micronesia and Zambia.

Countries requiring passports with a validity of at least 3 months beyond the date of intended departure include Azerbaijan, Bosnia and Herzegovina, Honduras, Montenegro, Nauru, Moldova and New Zealand. Similarly, the EEA countries of Iceland, Liechtenstein, Norway, all European Union countries (except Ireland) together with Switzerland also require 3 months validity beyond the date of the bearer's intended departure unless the bearer is an EEA or Swiss national.

Countries requiring passports valid for at least 3 months on arrival include Albania, North Macedonia, Panama, and Senegal.

Bermuda requires passports to be valid for at least 45 days upon entry.

Countries that require a passport validity of at least one month beyond the date of intended departure include Eritrea, Hong Kong, Lebanon, Macau, the Maldives and South Africa.

==== Maximum passport age ====
Countries of the Schengen area require non-EU passports to be less than 10 years old upon entry.

=== Criminal record ===
Some countries, including Australia, Canada, Fiji, New Zealand and the United States, routinely deny entry to non-citizens who have a criminal record, while others impose restrictions depending on the type of conviction and the length of the sentence.

=== Persona non grata ===
The government of a country can declare a diplomat persona non grata, banning them from entering the country or expelling them if they have already entered. In non-diplomatic use, the authorities of a country may also declare a foreigner persona non grata permanently or temporarily, usually because of unlawful activity.

=== Israeli stamps ===
Kuwait, Lebanon, Libya, and Yemen do not allow entry to people with passport stamps from Israel or whose passports have either a used or an unused Israeli visa, or where there is evidence of previous travel to Israel such as entry or exit stamps from neighbouring border posts in transit countries such as Jordan and Egypt.

To circumvent this Arab League boycott of Israel, the Israeli immigration services have now mostly ceased to stamp foreign nationals' passports on either entry to or exit from Israel (unless the entry is for some work-related purposes). Since 15 January 2013, Israel no longer stamps foreign passports at Ben Gurion Airport. Passports are still (as of 22 June 2017) stamped at Erez when passing into and out of Gaza.

Iran refuses admission to holders of passports containing an Israeli visa or stamp that is less than 12 months old.

=== Biometrics ===
Several countries mandate that all travellers, or all foreign travellers, be fingerprinted on arrival and will refuse admission to or even arrest travellers who refuse to comply. In some countries, such as the United States, this may apply even to transit passengers who merely wish to change planes rather than go landside.

Fingerprinting countries/regions include Afghanistan, Argentina, Brunei, Cambodia, China, Ethiopia, Ghana, Guinea, India, Japan, Kenya (both fingerprints and a photo are taken), Malaysia upon entry and departure, Mongolia, Saudi Arabia, the Schengen Area, Singapore, South Korea, Taiwan, Thailand, Uganda, the United Arab Emirates and the United States.

Many countries also require a photo be taken of people entering the country. The United States, which does not fully implement exit control formalities at its land frontiers (although long mandated by its own legislation), intends to implement facial recognition for passengers departing from international airports to identify people who overstay their visa.

Together with fingerprint and face recognition, iris scanning is one of three biometric identification technologies internationally standardised since 2006 by the International Civil Aviation Organization (ICAO) for use in e-passports and the United Arab Emirates conducts iris scanning on visitors who need to apply for a visa. The United States Department of Homeland Security has announced plans to greatly increase the biometric data it collects at US borders. In 2018, Singapore began trials of iris scanning at three land and maritime immigration checkpoints.

== See also ==
- Visa policy of Tuvalu
- Tuvaluan passport
