= Visa policy of Tuvalu =

Policy on permits required to enter Tuvalu

Most visitors to Tuvalu must obtain a visa on arrival unless they are citizens of one of the visa-exempt countries.

All visitors must have a passport valid for at least 6 months.

== Visa policy map ==
Visa policy of Tuvalu Tuvalu Visa not required (90 days) Free visa on arrival Visa on arrival

== Visa exemption ==
Citizens of the following countries and territories may enter Tuvalu without a visa for the following period:

90 days

- Taiwan

90 days within any 180 days

- European Union member states (except Ireland)

- Iceland
- Liechtenstein
- Norway
- Serbia
- Switzerland

Date of visa changes
- Unknown: Serbia, Taiwan
- 1 February 2019: European Union member states (except Ireland), Iceland, Liechtenstein, Norway, Switzerland

=== Future changes ===
Tuvalu has signed visa exemption agreements with the following countries, but they have not yet been ratified:

Country	Passports	Agreement signed on
Saint Kitts and Nevis	All	4 March 2022

== Visa on arrival ==
=== Free visa on arrival ===
Citizens of the following countries and territories are not required to pay a visa fee. They may obtain a visa on arrival for a maximum stay of 1 month:

- American Samoa
- Antigua and Barbuda
- Bahamas
- Belize
- Cayman Islands
- Cook Islands
- Fiji
- Gambia
- Gibraltar
- Grenada
- Hong Kong
- Jamaica
- Kenya
- Kiribati
- Lesotho
- Malawi
- Malaysia
- Maldives
- Mauritius
- Montserrat
- Nauru
- Niue
- Northern Mariana Islands
- Samoa
- Saint Kitts and Nevis
- Saint Lucia
- Saint Vincent and the Grenadines
- South Korea
- Tanzania
- Tonga
- Trinidad and Tobago
- Uganda
- United Kingdom
- Vanuatu
- Zambia

=== Visa on arrival ===
Citizens of other countries must obtain a visa on arrival for a maximum stay of 1 month. They must pay a visa fee (AUD 100).

== See also ==
- Visa requirements for Tuvaluan citizens
