= Murugappan family asylum claims =

Asylum claim case in Australia involving a Sri Lankan family

The Murugappan family, also known as the Nadesalingam family, consists of Nadesalingam Murugappan (Nades), his wife Kokilapathmapriya Nadesalingam (Priya) and their two daughters. They are Sri Lankan Tamils who sought asylum in Australia. The couple married in Australia after arriving separately on people smuggler boats; their children were subsequently born in Australia. After their detention by the Australian Border Force in March 2018, the family, which was resident in the central Queensland town of Biloela, was consequently referred to as the Biloela family by some media. The asylum application of the couple and their children was supported by some residents of Biloela as well as asylum-seeker advocates. The Australian federal government of the time, under Prime Minister Scott Morrison, assessed them not to be refugees and, consequently, detained and sought to remove them.

Following the Labor government win in the 2022 federal election, the family was granted bridging visas to allow them to return to Biloela, and subsequently granted permanent residency. As of August 2025 the family are settled in Biloela. They run a food truck business called Priya Nades Kitchen.

== Migration ==
Kokilapathmapriya Nadesalingam (Priya) and Nadesalingam Murugappan (Nades) were both living in Sri Lanka during the Sri Lankan Civil War which started in 1983 and formally ended in 2009 with the Sri Lankan Army defeating the separatist Liberation Tigers of Tamil Eelam (LTTE). Nades claimed to have been forced to join the LTTE in 2001 and as a result, claimed to be harassed by Sri Lankan government authorities. During and after the war, Nades travelled via Sri Lanka for work on three occasions on a Sri Lankan passport, on temporary work visas issued by the Sri Lankan government, to Qatar in 2004, Kuwait in 2008 and Qatar again in 2010. Therefore the Australian government claimed that Nades was not of concern to Sri Lankan authorities; this has been accepted in a number of subsequent reviews and court proceedings.

Outside the judicial system, these findings have found both criticism and support. Damien Kingsbury, an academic specialising in international politics, said even though the civil war had ended, Sri Lanka was still dangerous for some minorities, saying "The environment is changing and it's never been particularly favourable to Tamils but it looks like it's changing back to a more draconian environment". Kingsbury's view contradicts corroborated claims that the prior deportation of failed asylum seekers to Sri Lanka by successive governments, including Labor, numbering at least 2600, had been found to be living safely and successfully in Sri Lanka after their welfare had been checked. In relation to this particular case, an experienced immigration lawyer, Simon Jeans, described the Murugappans' bid to stay in Australia as a "train wreck", including that the family had not been truthful in visa applications, and that evidence suggested that they came to Australia as economic refugees.

Nades arrived at Christmas Island on a people smuggler boat in 2012. Priya left Sri Lanka in 2001 and went to Tamil Nadu, India, claiming she was being targeted due to her brother's supposed links to the LTTE. She arrived at Cocos Islands on another people smuggler boat in 2013 from Tamil Nadu, India, a safe haven for Tamil people fleeing Sri Lanka during the civil war that was unaffected by the civil war. Both arrived under the classification of the 'legacy caseload' having arrived by boat between 2012 and 2014. Legacy caseload arrivals have been classified as Irregular Maritime Arrivals and Illegal Maritime Arrivals. The Immigration Assessment Authority affirmed the ministerial delegate's decisions regarding the asylum claims, noting that Priya had been able to travel lawfully without issue from Sri Lanka to Tamil Nadu, India in 2001.

The Immigration Assessment Authority stated that years had passed since the civil war and "the risk profile of persons of adverse interest had changed". The Sri Lankan government was now inquiring after a different category of persons in the post-war and reconciliation period, described as "those with a significant role in post-conflict Tamil separatism". It was stated that the applicant Priya did not fall within this category of persons.

Both were granted temporary bridging visas. The couple first met in Australia and married on 7 November 2014. They subsequently had two children, born in Australia in May 2015 and June 2017. They settled in Biloela where Nades worked in the local abattoir. He was also a volunteer with the local Society of Saint Vincent de Paul.

The Murugappan family are also referred to as the Nadesalingam family, and in some media as "the Biloela family".

== Detention, appeals and health ==
In March 2018, Australian Border Force arrived at the Murugappans' home in Biloela at 5 am. The family was given 10 minutes to pack, then taken into custody by ABF personnel. They were taken to the Melbourne Immigration Transit Accommodation facility in Broadmeadows, a suburb of Melbourne. While in detention in Melbourne, supporters of the family claimed that the couple and their children had been ill-treated and denied basic nutrition and health care. The claim was refuted by the relevant department at the time, stating that the family was offered medical treatment several times and had declined it, and that at no point was the family denied medical care.

In June 2018, the Federal Court of Australia found that Priya was not eligible to stay in Australia, while Nades' rights of appeal were already extinguished. In the judgment, the judge noted that the civil war had ended in 2009, Nades had returned to Sri Lanka on three occasions during the civil war and found that there was "no evidence to suggest [Nades'] family still living in Sri Lanka was at risk from authorities". Priya lodged an appeal with the Administrative Appeals Tribunal. This appeal was dismissed in December 2018, however the government was restrained from deporting the family until February 2019. A further application by the couple to seek special leave to High Court of Australia to hear an appeal of the Federal Court decision was refused in May 2019. Including the negative finding by the High Court, the family had their asylum appeals to stay reviewed and rejected seven times through seven court and tribunal sessions.

An attempt to deport the couple, and their Australian-born children, on 29 August 2019 was prevented by an injunction lodged by the solicitors while the plane taking the family to Sri Lanka was in mid-air. This injunction was granted as the younger child had not yet been assessed for a protection visa. The injunction forced the plane to land in Darwin. The family was then taken to Christmas Island Immigration Reception and Processing Centre.

On 19 September 2019, the Federal Court ruled that the younger daughter (and hence the family) should remain in Australia until the case goes to a final hearing at a date to be determined. On 17 April 2020, the Federal Court ruled that Immigration Minister David Coleman had taken a procedural step to consider using ministerial powers to allow the younger daughter to apply for a visa, which now needs to be finalised. On 27 April 2020, the Federal Government was ordered to pay A$206,000 in legal fees for her, as she had "not [been] afforded procedural fairness".

On 21 October 2019, it was revealed in Senate estimates that the Australian government had spent approximately $30 million re-opening Christmas Island Detention Center and filling it with more than 100 staff, while the only detainees were the four members of the Murugappan family.

Over the weekend of 18–19 July 2020, Priya was flown from Christmas Island to Perth for medical treatment for severe abdominal pain and vomiting. She was flown back to Christmas Island on 29 July on a chartered flight.

On 8 June 2021, the younger daughter was flown to Perth Children's Hospital with a suspected blood infection. In the days that followed, it was determined that she had pneumonia and septicaemia. In the same month, the government decided to allow the family to live in community detention in Perth, rather than on Christmas Island.

On 12 August 2021, in addition to the preceding court and tribunal judgments, the High Court rejected the younger daughter's bid for the court to hear her visa case. The matter was now in the hands of Immigration Minister Alex Hawke.

On 23 September 2021, three of the family members were granted temporary 12 month visas, which will allow the family to remain in Australia. The youngest daughter (4 years old), was not granted a visa by the Immigration Minister and had to remain in detention. Therefore the entire family had to remain in detention.

On 22 January 2022, Federal Circuit Court allowed three of the family members to be able to reapply for bridging visas, rendering the earlier order made by Minister Hawke invalid.

== Release and permanent visas ==
On 25 May 2022, interim home affairs minister Jim Chalmers granted the family a bridging visa which will allow them to live and work in Biloela while they work towards the resolution of their immigration status. On 10 June 2022, the family travelled back to Biloela, where they were greeted by supporters.

On 5 August 2022, the Department of Home Affairs advised the family that they had been granted permanent visas. Minister for Immigration, Citizenship and Multicultural Affairs Andrew Giles said he has decided to grant the visas after carefully considering their “complex and specific circumstances”.

As of August 2025 the family are settled in Biloela. They run a food truck business called Priya Nades Kitchen and say that they are very happy to be living there.

A play based on their story, called Back to Bilo, premiered at the Brisbane Festival in September 2025.

== Reaction ==
The family's wish to stay in Australia has been supported by some members of the Biloela community as well as refugee and asylum seeker advocates. Anthony Albanese, Prime Minister of Australia has supported granting permanent residency to the family, stating "These people should be settled here in Australia. It won't undermine the government's migration policies. It will simply say that this is a government that is prepared to listen to what the community are saying and saying so strongly". Albanese had to concede that the courts had found that the family are not genuine refugees when questioned. Former National Party leader Barnaby Joyce also spoke in support, noting that the Biloela community "seem to be pretty enthused about keeping this family there ... I think we should also be listening to them." A change.org petition in support of the family, begun by Biloela resident Angela Fredericks, gained over 600,000 signatures.

The former Minister for Home Affairs Peter Dutton stated that the family's case was "completely without merit in terms of their claim to be refugees" and "I would like the family to accept that they are not refugees, they're not owed protection by our country". Dutton also called the two children of the Biloela family “anchor babies”. This was despite the fact that, unlike the United States, Australia does not have birthright citizenship, so the term "anchor baby" is not relevant to Australian law. Prime Minister Scott Morrison refused calls to intervene, stating "they didn't come to the country in the appropriate way. They have not been found to have an asylum claim" and "to exercise intervention powers on this would be to send exactly the wrong message to those who are looking to sell tickets to vulnerable people looking to get on boats ..." Morrison stated that the family remain eligible to lodge an application to migrate to Australia; "they can make an application to come to Australia under the same processes as everyone else, anywhere else in the world. And I would hope they do."
