= Birth tourism in Hong Kong =

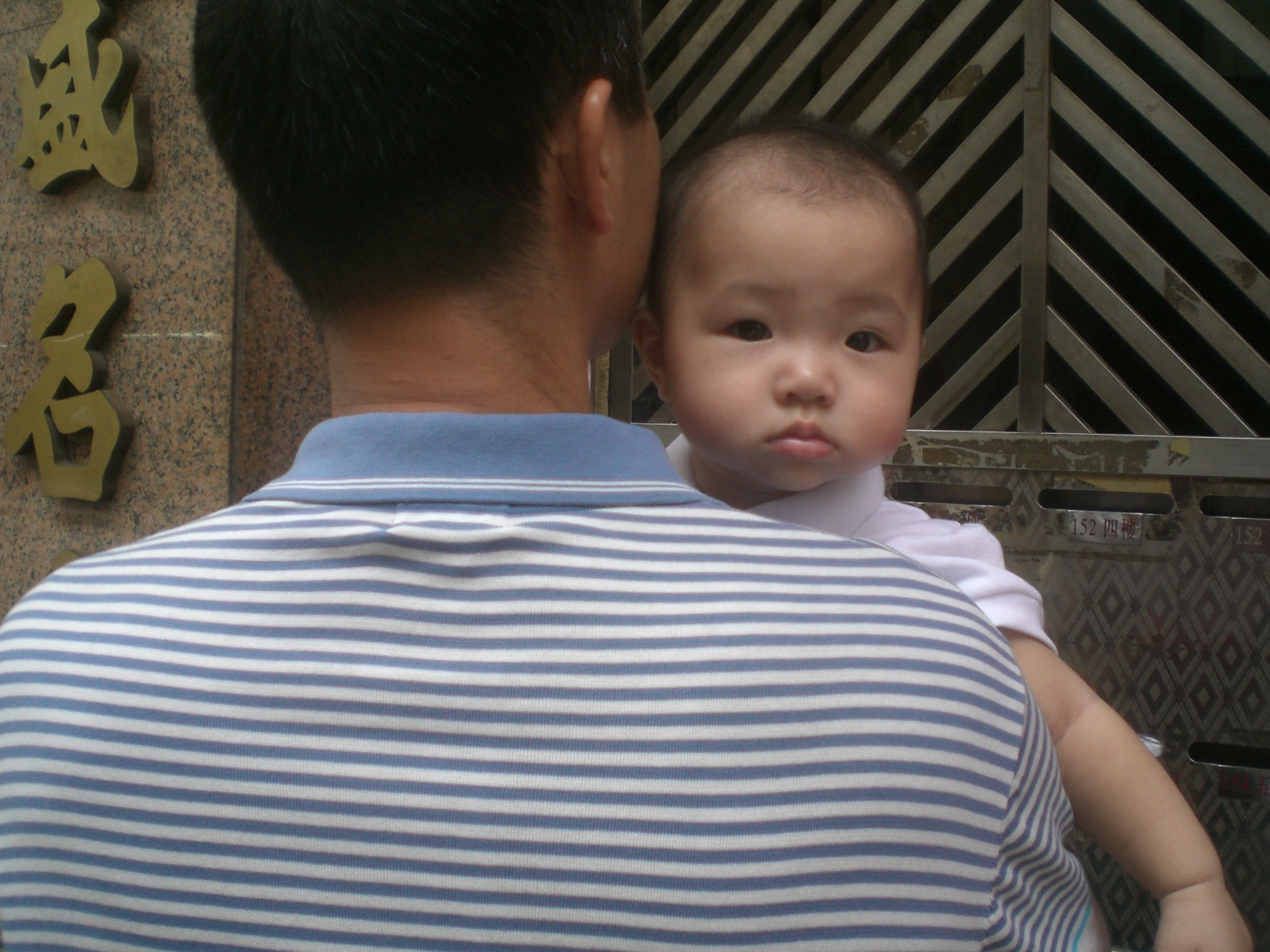
Baby girl in Hong Kong

The term "anchor babies in Hong Kong" (Chinese: 雙非嬰兒) refers to children born in Hong Kong whose parents (usually from mainland China) are not Hong Kong permanent residents.

Since 2003, an Individual Visit Scheme targeted to boost the economy of Hong Kong has begun. It provides an opportunity for pregnant women visiting from mainland China to give birth to their infants in Hong Kong. This entitles their children to the right of abode in Hong Kong as well as the opportunity to benefit from Hong Kong's education system.

These pregnant women use local obstetric services through legal (e.g. births through reservation) or illegal (e.g. A&E births) ways. The large influx of visiting mainland pregnant women causes a shortage of hospital resources, resulting in much criticism of visiting pregnant women and their anchor children, including labelling them as "locusts". Over 170,000 new births were anchor babies between 2001 and 2011 in which 32,653 were born in 2010.

CY Leung's first public announcement on policy as chief executive-elect was to impose a 'zero' quota on mainland mothers giving birth in Hong Kong. Leung further underlined that those who did may not be able to secure the right of abode for their offspring in Hong Kong.

== See also ==
- Birth tourism
- Hong Kong–Mainland China conflict
- Right of abode in Hong Kong
