= Basotho nationality law =

Lesotho Citizenship Order

Parliament of Lesotho
- Long title: Lesotho Citizenship Order No. 16 of 1971
- Enacted by: Government of Lesotho
- Status: Amended

Basotho nationality law is regulated by the Constitution of Lesotho, as amended; the Lesotho Citizenship Order, and its revisions; the 1983 Refugees Act; and various international agreements to which the country is a signatory. These laws determine who is, or is eligible to be, a national of Lesotho. The legal means to acquire nationality, formal legal membership in a nation, differ from the domestic relationship of rights and obligations between a national and the nation, known as citizenship. Nationality describes the relationship of an individual to the state under international law, whereas citizenship is the domestic relationship of an individual within the nation. In Britain and thus the Commonwealth of Nations, though the terms are often used synonymously outside of law, they are governed by different statutes and regulated by different authorities. Basotho nationality is typically obtained under the principle of jus soli, born in Lesotho, or jus sanguinis, i.e. by birth in Lesotho or abroad to parents with Basotho nationality. It can be granted to persons with an affiliation to the country, or to a permanent resident who has lived in the country for a given period of time through naturalisation.

== Acquisition of nationality ==
Nationality can be acquired in Lesotho at birth or later in life through naturalision.

=== By birth ===
Those who acquire nationality at birth include:

- Children born in Lesotho as long as either of their parents do not have diplomatic immunity or are enemy aliens;
- Children born abroad if either of their parents is a citizen of Lesotho otherwise than by descent; or
- Children who would otherwise be stateless.

=== By naturalisation ===
Naturalisation in Lesotho can be granted to persons who have resided in the territory for a sufficient period of time to confirm they understand SeSotho or English and the customs and traditions of Lesotho. General provisions are that applicants have good character and conduct; are of legal capacity; and have adequate means of self-support. Applicants must typically have resided in the country for five years. Besides foreigners meeting the criteria, other persons who may be naturalised include:

- Children legally adopted by a Basotho parent, who at the time of completion of a legal adoption request nationality;
- The spouse of a Basotho national after five years of continuous cohabitation in Lesotho, who has taken an oath of loyalty;
- Minor children may automatically be registered when their parent acquires nationality;
- Refugees who have resided in the country for six years (five years cumulatively plus continuously the year preceding the application); or
- Persons from Commonwealth nations or those who are stateless, may naturalise with some conditions waived.

== Loss of nationality ==
Basotho nationals can renounce their nationality pending approval by the state. Naturalised persons may be denaturalized in Lesotho for committing crimes against the state or state security; ordinary crimes; for residing abroad; or for fraud, misrepresentation, or concealment in a registration petition. Persons who previously had nationality and wish to repatriate if they voluntarily lost their status because of dual nationality must request reinstatement.

== Dual nationality ==
Dual nationality was typically not allowed in Lesotho, except in the case of automatic acquisition of another nationality because of marriage. A 2005 High Court decision ruled that nationals of origin could not be deprived of their Basotho status if they acquired another nationality for economic reasons with no intention of terminating their domicile or right of residence. A conflicting 2008 ruling by the Lesotho Court of Appeal held that voluntary acquisition of another nationality could be grounds for denaturalisation. In 2018, the Constitution was amended to allow dual nationality.

== History ==
=== African empires and European contact (1600–1867) ===
From the fifteenth century, SeSotho-speaking people who had separated from SeTwana-speaking groups migrated into the southern Highveld plateau. They built large settlements over the next century, which typically were populated by over 1,000 people. Continued southern migration to the Caledon River basin required smaller socio-political organization because of geographical and ecological differences. Their small communities were isolated from each other and primarily were agricultural chiefdoms. The villages were made up of the headman, and his kinship network, who divided the communal fields in a feudal system, which provided land and security in exchange for loyalty and labour. The chiefdoms had commercial relationships with Tswana tribes to the north and from the eighteenth century encountered European traders in Tswana territory, but Europeans did not penetrate the Caledon Valley until the nineteenth century.

Around 1820, Moshoeshoe left his home village at Menkhoaneng and founded a new chiefdom at the base of Botha Bothe Mountain. During the Difaqane, raiders under Shaka, ruler of the Zulu Kingdom, invaded the area destabilizing the social and political structures. The disruptions of these raids destroyed many villages, killed off the cattle, and left many inhabitants homeless. Moshoeshoe dealt with the invaders combining diplomacy, by paying tribute, and force, through strategic attacks, to build alliances with other chiefs. Seeking a more tactically protected space, in 1824, he led more than 100 followers to the Thaba Bosiu plateau. There were other BaSotho and Nguni people living on the plateau, with whom Moshoeshoe continued his policies of paying tribute and using force if necessary, to build his alliances. By 1833, he had consolidated many of the chieftainships in the area, becoming the Morena e Moholo, or high chief of the region.

In 1834, Wesleyan missionaries had entered the plateau, and settled in Moshoeshoe's territory. There were increasing contacts between European neighbors from the Cape Colony and Orange River Sovereignty. By 1854 the BoSotho Nation of Moshoeshoe controlled the area around Thaba Bosiu, and areas to the northeast and southwest where his kinsmen and allies served as chiefs. Within a decade, Moshoeshoe's state included around thirty settlements. European settlers increasingly encroached upon his territory, depriving his subjects of their land and creating internal conflicts within the nation. In an effort to protect his people, Moshoeshoe, reached out to the British government in 1867, imploring them to secure protection of their lands. On 9 December, the colonial administrator for the Cape Colony Philip Wodehouse was able to secure an agreement from the Duke of Buckingham, who was serving as the Colonial Secretary, to incorporate Basutoland into the Colony of Natal.

=== British period (1868–1966) ===
Moshoeshoe was informed of the arrangement for his people to be annexed to Natal and advised that they would become British subjects and granted protection on 12 March 1868. A year after Moshoeshoe's death in 1870, the British transferred Basutoland Colony to the administration of the Cape Colony, but mismanagement by the Colonial Government there led the Cape Colony to relinquish responsibility to the crown in 1884. In Britain, allegiance, in which subjects pledged to support a monarch, was the precursor to the modern concept of nationality. The crown recognised from 1350 that all persons born within the territories of the British Empire were subjects. Those born outside the realm — except children of those serving in an official post abroad, children of the monarch, and children born on a British sailing vessel — were considered by common law to be foreigners. Marriage did not affect the status of a subject of the realm, except that under common law, single women, including divorcées, were not allowed to be parents thus their children could not derive nationality maternally and were stateless unless legitimated by their father. Nationality laws passed by the British Parliament were extended only to the Kingdom of Great Britain, and later the United Kingdom of Great Britain and Ireland.

In 1911, at the Imperial Conference a decision was made to draft a common nationality code for use across the empire. The British Nationality and Status of Aliens Act 1914 allowed local jurisdictions in the self-governing Dominions to continue regulating nationality in their territories, but also established an imperial nationality scheme throughout the realm. The uniform law, which went into effect on 1 January 1915, required a married woman to derive her nationality from her spouse, meaning if he was British, she was also, and if he was foreign, so was she. It stipulated that upon loss of nationality of a husband, a wife could declare that she wished to remain British and provided that if a marriage had terminated, through death or divorce, a British-born national who had lost her status through marriage could reacquire British nationality through naturalisation without meeting a residency requirement. The statute reiterated common law provisions for natural-born persons born within the realm on or after the effective date. By using the word person, the statute nullified legitimacy requirements for jus soli nationals. For those born abroad on or after the effective date, legitimacy was still required, and could only be derived by a child from a British father (one generation), who was natural-born or naturalised. Naturalisations required five years residence or service to the crown.

Amendments to the British Nationality Act were enacted in 1918, 1922, 1933 and 1943 changing derivative nationality by descent and modifying slightly provisions for women to lose their nationality upon marriage. Because of a rise in statelessness, a woman who did not automatically acquire her husband's nationality upon marriage or upon his naturalisation in another country, did not lose their British status after 1933. The 1943 revision allowed a child born abroad at any time to be a British national by descent if the Secretary of State agreed to register the birth. Under the terms of the British Nationality Act 1948 British nationals in Basutoland were reclassified at that time as "Citizens of the UK and Colonies" (CUKC). The basic British nationality scheme did not change overmuch, and typically those who were previously defined as British remained the same. Changes included that wives and children no longer automatically acquired the status of the husband or father, children who acquired nationality by descent no longer were required to make a retention declaration, and registrations for children born abroad were extended.

Until well after the end of World War II, Britain continued to pursue policies to reunite Basutoland with the Union of South Africa. Abandoning the plan in 1960, tentative measures were implemented to transition the territory to self-rule. A constitution was drafted for a constitutional monarchy governed by the Westminster system, under Moshoeshoe II. On 4 October 1966, the Colony of Basutoland gained independence as the Kingdom of Lesotho.

=== Post-independence (1966–present) ===
Under the terms of the Independence Constitution, persons who had been CUKCs of Britain, regardless of whether that was through birth or naturalisation in Lesotho, became nationals of the new nation and ceased to be British. Persons who were descended of those who were Basotho by origin, also were conferred nationality on independence day, but those descended of naturalised persons did not obtain Basotho status. Women who were married to men who became Basotho on independence day, or would have become Basotho nationals except for their death, were also conferred nationality. Those who did not qualify to become Basotho at independence did not lose their status as either a CUKC or a British Protected Person. After independence, children born in Lesotho became nationals by birth in the country as long as their father was not an enemy alien or he had diplomatic immunity. Children born abroad to a Basotho father or children born to stateless fathers could also derive nationality after independence, as could women who married Basotho men. The constitution did not allow dual nationality and provided that a subsequent law would be drafted detailing provisions for acquiring nationality through registration or naturalisation.

In 1970, the Independence Constitution was suspended and a new government formed. The following year, the Lesotho Citizenship Order 1971 was passed, which reiterated the provisions for acquisition and loss of nationality spelled out in the initial constitution. It was amended in 1972 adding a section which specified that certain persons who were erroneously given dual nationality by virtue of the arrangements at independence were no longer Basotho. A new constitution was approved in 1984, but it did not change provisions regarding nationality. The Lesotho Citizenship (Amendment) Order, 1989 amended the Citizenship order to specify that to attain Basotho nationality at birth at least one parent must be Basotho, unless the child would otherwise be stateless. In 1993, the constitution was rewritten providing for gender equality and repealed the section of the Citizenship Order which had previously not allowed children born abroad to derive nationality maternally. In 2018, the Constitution was amended to allow women to pass on their nationality to a spouse and to allow dual nationality. The Immigration and Citizenship Bill 2018 was drafted with the intent of replacing the Aliens Control Act of 1966 and the 1971 Citizenship Order. (Note: The status of the bill is unclear, as the International Organization for Migration reported in September 2018, that the bill was in the finalization stage before the Parliament of Lesotho in June 2018. A 2020 Universal Periodic Review calls the legislation the Immigration and Citizenship Bill 2019 and states that it "uplifts the discriminatory provisions which were favouring women married to Lesotho citizens over foreign men who marry Basotho"; however, the Ministry of Home Affairs for Lesotho, indicated on its website in 2021 that the Immigration and Citizenship Bill 2018 was still a current proposal in 2021.)
