= Chadian nationality law =

Chadian Nationality Code

Parliament of Chad
- Long title: Code de la nationalité tchadienne, Ordonnance N°. 33/PG-Int du 14 août 1962
- Enacted by: Government of Chad
- Status: Current legislation

Chadian nationality law is regulated by the Constitution of Chad, as amended; the Chadian Nationality Code, and its revisions; and various international agreements to which the country is a signatory. These laws determine who is, or is eligible to be, a national of Chad. The legal means to acquire nationality, formal legal membership in a nation, differ from the domestic relationship of rights and obligations between a national and the nation, known as citizenship. Chadian nationality is typically obtained under the principle of jus soli, i.e. by birth in Chad, or jus sanguinis, born abroad to parents with Chadian nationality. It can be granted to persons with an affiliation to the country, or to a permanent resident who has lived in the country for a given period of time through naturalization.

== Acquisition of nationality ==
Nationality can be acquired in Chad at birth or later in life through naturalization.

=== By birth ===
Those who acquire nationality at birth include:

- Children born anywhere whose both parents are Chadian nationals. When only one parent is a national of Chad, a child can become a national if he or she would be rendered stateless;
- Foundlings or orphans discovered in the territory whose parents are unknown; or
- Persons of African origin who have resided in the country for fifteen years and assimilated to Chadian culture are eligible to acquire nationality of origin in Chad.

=== By naturalization ===
Naturalization can be granted to persons who have resided in the territory for a sufficient period of time to confirm they understand the customs and traditions of the society. General provisions are that applicants have good mental and physical health, are of good character and have no criminal convictions, and have resided in the country for fifteen years. To obtain naturalization, applicants submit to the Ministry of the Interior documentation which includes proof of residency and employment, identity and educational documents, police or criminal records, certificates of health, and taxation records. In addition, applicants must provide proof of fluency in French or another language in use in Chad, as well as their assimilation into the society. Upon review successful applicants are granted naturalization by presidential decree. Besides foreigners meeting the criteria, other persons who may be naturalized include:

- The spouse of a Chadian national;
- Minor children can be automatically naturalized when their parent acquires nationality;
- Adoptees acquire Chadian nationality automatically upon completion of an adoption order; or
- A foreigner who has performed exceptional services to the nation can naturalize without meeting residency requirements.

== Loss of nationality ==
Chadian nationals cannot be denaturalized, if they were born in the territory. Nationality may be lost in Chad for acts of disloyalty; committing crimes against the state; or for fraud in a naturalization petition.

== Dual nationality ==
Dual nationality has been allowed in Chad since 1962; however, the presidency is not open to candidates who have more than Chadian nationality.

== History ==
=== French period (1893–1960) ===
The French established a protectorate over the Sultanate of Baghirmi in 1893, having previously laid claim to French Congo, also known as Moyen-Congo, Gabon and Ubangi-Shari. In 1896, a French military expedition left Gabon with the intent of linking all of the French territory from Senegal on the Atlantic coast to French Somaliland on the coast of the Arabian Sea. Seen by the British as an attempt to thwart their expansion from north to south, the two powers clashed during the Fashoda incident and France abandoned its plan retreating to Bangui in 1899. Around the same time, the French expanded northwards to create a military buffer zone in Chad. Unwilling to foot the expense of a colony, the French saw Chad as a source of cotton and labor for its other colonies. In 1900, the French defeated Rabih and began establishing protectorates among the Juhaynah, or Baggara Arabs, including the Awlad Rashid, Haimad, Ja'atna, and Khuzam tribes. On 29 December 1903, Ubangi-Shari was formally decreed as a colony and two years later was merged with Chad into a single territory. The following year, the French federated their colonies of French Gabon, Moyen-Congo, and Ubangi-Shari-Chad into French Equatorial Africa. By 1904, French influence had spread from the area around Lake Chad to Lake Fitri. Within three years, the French established rule over the Messiria tribe and in 1909, began the conquest of the Wadai, who were defeated in 1912.

In 1848, slavery was abolished throughout the French Empire and the Civil Code was extended to all of the French citizens in the colonies. Under the Civil Code, women were legally incapacitated and paternal authority was established over their children. Upon marriage, a woman married to a French man automatically acquired the same nationality as her spouse. Illegitimate children were barred from inheritance and nationality could only be transmitted through a father. Non-citizen nationals were governed by traditional laws concerning marriage and inheritance which placed the well-being of the community above individual rights. These laws prevented a wife from being treated as a slave, required her husband to support her, and entitled her kin to a bride price, to compensate them for the loss of her fertility to their kinship group and secure the legality of the union. Having paid the price for the marriage contract, she and her offspring belonged to the kinship network of her husband and could be inherited if her husband died.

The French Nationality Law of 1889 codified previous statutory laws, changing the French standard from jus sanguinis to jus soli and was extended to the French West Indies. Under its terms, women who would become stateless by the rule to acquire their spouse's nationality were allowed to retain their French nationality upon marriage. The Nationality Law was modified in 1897 when it was extended to the remainder of the French colonies. Clarification in the 1897 decree included that bestowing nationality by birth in French territory only applied to children born in France, restoring descent requirements for the colonies. Under the Code de l'indigénat (Code of Indigenous Status) promulgated for Algeria in 1881 and extended to French Equatorial Africa in 1910, nationals in the new colonies followed customary law. On 23 May 1912, a decree was issued specifically addressing the status of French Equatorial Africans. Under its terms, native persons born in Equatorial Africa were nationals of France but not citizens and were subject to the Indigenous Code. Upon reaching the age of twenty-one, they could be naturalized; however, the law was explicit that neither a wife nor the children of a naturalized Equatorial African automatically derived his French nationality. Only if the spouses were married under French law and the children registered in the Civil Registry could they acquire the status of the husband or father. (Note: Yerri Urban, a public law lecturer at the University of the French Antilles notes that at the time the law went into effect, there were no provisions to allow native Africans to register births in the European Civil Registry.) To naturalize Equatorial Africans had to be able to both read and write French and had to have served in the French military service or have been decorated with the Legion of Honor.

Chad was detached from Ubangi-Shari in 1914 and became a separate colony in 1920. Following the end of World War I France passed a law, "Décret N°. 24 on 25 March 1915 that allowed subjects or protected persons who were non-citizen nationals and had established domicile in a French territory to acquire full citizenship, including the naturalization of their wives and minor children, by having received the cross of the Legion of Honor, having obtained a university degree, having rendered service to the nation, having attained the rank of an officer or received a medal from the French army, who had married a Frenchwoman and established a one-year residency; or who had resided for more than ten years in a colony other than their country of origin. A 14 January 1918 decree written for Equatorial Africa and French West Africa was aimed to provide naturalization for decorated veterans of the war and their families, providing they had not previously been denied their rights nor participated in actions against French rule.

In 1927, France passed a new Nationality Law, which under Article 8, removed the requirement for married women to automatically derive the nationality of a husband and provided that her nationality could only be changed if she consented to change her nationality. It also allowed children born in France to native-born French women married to foreigners to acquire their nationality from their mothers. When it was implemented it included Guadeloupe, Martinique and Réunion but was extended to the remaining French possessions for French citizens only in 1928. Under Article 26 of the 1928 decree was the stipulation that it did not apply to natives of the French possessions except Algeria, Guadeloupe, Martinique, and Réunion. A decade later, the legal incapacity of married women was finally invalidated for French citizens. In 1939, France determined that marriage and inheritance were too significant to continue being dealt with in native courts. That year, the Mandel Decree was enacted in French West Africa as well as French Equatorial Africa. Under its terms child marriage was discouraged. It established the minimum age at marriage as fourteen for women and sixteen for men, invalidated marriages wherein spouses did not consent, and nullified levirate marriage without approval of the woman.

At the end of World War II, a statute issued on 7 March 1944 granted French citizenship to those who had performed services to the nation, such as serving as civil servants or receiving recognitions. The Constitution of 1946 granted French citizenship to all subjects of France's territories without having to renounce their personal status as natives. Under its terms, Chad was classified as an Overseas Territory within the French Union. In 1945, a new Code of French Nationality was passed, which conferred once again automatic French nationality on foreign wives of French men, but allowed mothers who were French nationals to pass their nationality to children born outside of France. It expressly applied to Algeria, French Guiana, Guadeloupe, Martinique and Réunion and was extended to the Overseas Territories in 1953, but in the case of the latter had distinctions for the rights of those who were naturalized.

In 1951 the Jacquinot Decree strengthened the provisions in French West and Equatorial Africa of the Mandel decree removing women who were twenty-one years old, or divorced, from control by a father or guardian and establishing specific rules for the payment and determining the amount of a bride price. In 1958, French Equatorial Africa was dissolved under pressure for autonomy by the African colonies and the Chadian Territorial Assembly promulgated the first constitution for the country in March 1959. With the passage of the 1958 French Constitution, nationality provisions were standardized for France, Overseas Departments, and Overseas Territories. Article 86 excluded the possibility for independence of the colonies. The French Constitution was amended on 1960 to allow states to maintain membership in the Community even if they were independent republics. In July 1960, negotiations in Paris set terms for independence and a transfer of power.

=== Post-independence (1960–present) ===
Chad gained independence on 11 August 1960, as the Republic of Chad. Subsequently, on 14 August 1962, the Nationality Code (Ordonnance N°. 33/PG-Int) was passed. Subsequently, a law (Décret no 211/PG.-INT) was passed on 6 November 1963 specifying the procedures to be followed to implement the provisions of the nationality code.
