= Tuvaluan nationality law =

Tuvaluan Citizenship Act

Parliament of Tuvalu
- Long title: An Act relating to Tuvaluan citizenship
- Enacted by: Government of Tuvalu
- Status: Current legislation

Tuvaluan nationality law is regulated by the 1986 Constitution of Tuvalu, as amended; the 1979 Citizenship Ordinance, and its revisions; and various British Nationality laws. These laws determine who is, or is eligible to be, a national of Tuvalu. Tuvaluan nationality is typically obtained either on the principle of jus soli, i.e. by birth in Tuvalu or under the rules of jus sanguinis, i.e. by birth abroad to parents with Tuvaluan nationality. It can be granted to persons with an affiliation to the country, or to a permanent resident who has lived in the country for a given period of time through naturalisation. Nationality establishes one's international identity as a member of a sovereign nation. Though it is not synonymous with citizenship, for rights granted under domestic law for domestic purposes, the United Kingdom, and thus the Commonwealth, have traditionally used the words interchangeably.

== Acquiring Tuvaluan nationality ==
Nationality in Tuvalu is acquired at birth, or later in life by registration or naturalisation.

=== By birth ===
Persons who acquire nationality at birth include:

- Any persons born in Tuvalu, unless a parent holds diplomatic immunity;
- Persons born abroad to a national of Tuvalu; or
- Foundlings, as long as there is not indication of other nationality.

=== By registration ===
Nationality by registration includes those who have familial or historic relationship affiliations with Tuvalu. Persons who acquire nationality by registration include:

- Persons who have been adopted by a national, or a person who would have been a national except for death, of Tuvalu;
- Any minor children of a Tuvaluan national, or a person who would have been a national except for their death;
- Foreign spouses of Tuvaluans; or
- Persons who did not automatically derive nationality at the time of Tuvaluan independence.

=== By naturalisation ===
Regular naturalisation in Tuvalu is acquired by submitting an application to the Citizenship Commission responsible for immigration. Applicants must verify that they are of good character; are financially self-sufficient; and intend to reside in the territory. They must be able to demonstrate residence in the country for a minimum of seven years. Former nationals who previously lost nationality may apply for naturalisation after a five year residency. Another category for special naturalisation includes those who have served the government in a paid position abroad for a minimum of seven years. Applicants who are approved for naturalisation are required to take a loyalty oath.

== Loss of nationality ==
Tuvaluan nationals may renounce their nationality provided they have legal majority and capacity and have obtained other nationality, though in times of war, the renunciation may not be allowed. Denaturalisation may occur only if a person obtained nationality through fraud, false representation, or concealment.

== Dual nationality ==
Since 2009, dual nationality has been allowed in Tuvalu.

== History ==
=== Pre-colonial period (1568–1915) ===
In 1568, Álvaro de Mendaña, a Spanish navigator, sighted an atoll he called the Isla de Jesus, now known as Nui. Almost thirty years later, Mendaña noted Niulakita, which he identified as La Solitaria. Two centuries after their initial sighting, navigators reported discovering these two islands, calling them Nederlandisch Island and Independence Island, respectively. In 1781, the Spanish explorer Francisco Antonio Mourelle identified the Isla del Cocal, sometimes identified now as Nanumanga and other times identified as Niutao, and San Augustin Island, now Nanumea. Most of the remaining islands in the archipelago formed by the Gilbert and Ellice Islands were identified as a result of commercial trading expeditions between the seventeenth and nineteenth century. In 1819, an American-born, British captain, Arent DePeyster first used Ellice Island as a reference for Funafuti, but Charles Wilkes, who led the United States Exploring Expedition, 1838–1842 applied the name to the entire archipelago of what would become later Tuvalu. Governance of the islands was led by a hereditary chief, known as an aliki, or group of chiefs elected by a council of elders, who were male members of various clans. Chiefs were able to demand rights to production by the inhabitants for personal and community benefit. They were assisted by headmen who administrated and supervised the population, distributing food, land, and organising fishing expeditions. Families performed specific inherited tasks for the community — some were builders, some were farmers, others provided for defence.

From the early part of the 19th century, there were conflicts among European powers, who were establishing spheres of influence in the Pacific. British policy was to avoid annexation but to intervene on behalf of its nationals if conflict arose and through show of force, intimidate local leaders. Trading contacts with Europeans in the Ellice Islands were sporadic throughout the 1840s and 1850s, centering on the whaling industry. In the 1860s and 1870s, Samoan missionaries who had been trained by the London Missionary Society began their work founding churches and schools on each of the islands. In 1877 the Governor-General of Fiji was given extended powers as High Commissioner to take responsibility for all British subjects in any Western Pacific Island not within the jurisdiction of another "civilized power". In 1886, Germany and Britain signed the Anglo-German Declarations about the Western Pacific Ocean to establish terms of their interaction and delineate the territories with which each was aligned. Despite the accord, Germany continued attempts to control the Gilbert Islands and in 1888, petitioned the government to annex them. Eager to gain German support to buffer French hostility for British involvement in Egypt, the Foreign Office rejected annexation. The Colonial Office recognised the need to take pre-emptive action because of growing involvement of the United States in the region. In 1856, the United States had passed the Guano Islands Act, which gave US nationals the right to claim any island not within another governmental jurisdiction, to expand the search for guano deposits, an important fertilizer component at the time. This created several competing claims for islands in major waterways throughout the globe.

To limit the cost and permanence of a colony, the Cabinet declared the Gilbert Islands a British protectorate in 1892, allowing the existing government to operate under British supervision. Later that year, the same status was extended to the Ellice Islands. Charles Swayne was appointed as the Resident Commissioner and upon arriving in the islands in 1893, formalised the customary social organisation, granting chiefs and elders leadership authority, and establishing a court and policing system, and a secretary-treasurer to monitor taxation. He also codified existing laws and developed a common legal code for all of the islands. In 1900, when phosphate was discovered on Ocean Island, the Resident Commissioner of the Gilbert Island Protectorate was extended in 1901, supervisory authority over that island as well. As most of the revenue for administrating the islands came from phosphate mining, the headquarters for the Protectorate moved to Ocean Island in 1908. Concerns that the extensive mining operations would eventually render Ocean Island uninhabitable propelled authorities in 1912 to begin discussing consolidation of the islands into a single jurisdiction under British control. In 1915, an Order in Council changed the Protectorate to the Gilbert and Ellice Islands Colony.

=== British colony (1915–1979) ===
The British Nationality and Status of Aliens Act 1914 allowed local jurisdictions in the self-governing Dominions to continue regulating nationality in their territories, but also established an imperial nationality scheme throughout the realm. The uniform law, which went into effect on 1 January 1915, required a married woman to derive her nationality from her spouse, meaning if he was British, she was also, and if he was foreign, so was she. It stipulated that upon loss of nationality of a husband, a wife could declare that she wished to remain British and provided that if a marriage had terminated, through death or divorce, a British-born national who had lost her status through marriage could reacquire British nationality through naturalisation without meeting a residency requirement. The statute reiterated common law provisions for natural-born persons, those born within the realm on or after the effective date, to be British subjects. By using the word person, the statute nullified legitimacy requirements for jus soli nationals which had existed in previous nationality laws. For those born abroad on or after the effective date, legitimacy was still required, and could only be derived by a child from a British father (one generation), who was natural-born or naturalised. Naturalisations required five years residence or service to the crown.

In 1916, the Gilbert and Ellice Islands Colony became a crown colony which included Fanning, Ocean, Union, and Washington Islands. Amendments to the British Nationality Act were enacted in 1918, 1922, 1933 and 1943 changing derivative nationality by descent and modifying slightly provisions for women to lose their nationality upon marriage. In 1919, Christmas Island was annexed to the Colony and in 1925, Union Island was transferred to the administration of New Zealand. Because of a rise in statelessness, a woman who did not automatically acquire her husband's nationality upon marriage or upon his naturalisation in another country, did not lose their British status after 1933. In 1937, because of a need for additional land to accommodate a growing population, the Phoenix Islands were incorporated into the Gilbert and Ellice Islands Colony. A disputed claim to the Canton and Enderbury Islands of the Phoenix group led to an agreement in 1939 between Britain and the United States for joint administration of those two islands as a protected state. The 1943 revision to British nationality law allowed a child born abroad at any time to be a British national by descent if the Secretary of State agreed to register the birth.

Under the terms of the British Nationality Act 1948 British nationals in Gilbert and Ellice Islands Colony were reclassified at that time as "Citizens of the UK and Colonies" (CUKC). The basic British nationality scheme did not change overmuch, and typically those who were previously defined as British remained the same. Changes included that wives and children no longer automatically acquired the status of the husband or father, children who acquired nationality by descent no longer were required to make a retention declaration, and registrations for children born abroad were extended. In response to a call from the United Nations for decolonisation, in 1963 an Advisory Council was established, and a constitution was drawn up for the Colony in 1967. By an Order in Council of 1970, a Legislative Council began operating, but population imbalance made representation on the Council favor Gilbert Island. Elice Islanders began to press for separation from the colony. In 1971, the remaining central and southern Line Islands were joined to the Gilbert and Ellice Islands Colony. As of 31 December 1974 the Protectorate for Canton Island ceased and persons living there became stateless. On 1 October 1975 the Ellice Islands were detached from the Colony, and renamed as the Colony of Tuvalu. The new House of Assembly of Tuvalu voted for full self-governance in 1976 and began working on a constitution aiming for full independence in 1978.

=== Post-Independence (1978–present) ===
On 1 October 1978, Tuvalu gained independence from Britain. Generally, persons, who had previously been nationals as defined under the classification of "Citizens of the UK and Colonies" in the colony, would become nationals of Tuvalu on Independence Day and cease to be British nationals. The constitution conferred nationality for persons who had been born, registered, naturalised, or British Protected Persons in the former colony and upon married women whose husbands became nationals of Tuvalu, or would have become except for death, on 1 October 1978. Exceptions were made for persons to retain their British nationality and status if they (or their father or grandfather) were born, naturalised, or registered in a part of the realm which remained at the independence of Tuvalu part of the United Kingdom or colonies, or had been annexed by such a place. Women who were married to persons who retained their CUKC status remained CUKCs unless their husband lost his status. The constitution also gave persons who had belonger status in the country and was not automatically granted nationality two years to make application to become a national of Tuvalu, provided they did not hold other nationality.

In 1979, the United States and Tuvalu signed a treaty in which the US abandoned claims to the four southernmost islands in Tuvalu's territory. That same year, the legislature of Tuvalu passed Ordinance No. 5 to define nationality and citizenship in the territory. In 1986, the constitution was revised and women were granted their own rights to nationality. Further revisions were made to the Constitution in 1992 which included allowing a woman who had lost her nationality previously because of marriage to regain it, if the marriage had terminated; granted foreign husbands the ability to derive nationality from their Tuvaluan wife; and allowed children to derive nationality from their mothers. An amendment to the Constitution in 2009, allowed Tuvaluans to hold dual nationality.

== Commonwealth citizenship ==
Citizens of Tuvalu are also Commonwealth citizens.

== Travel freedom of Tuvaluan nationals ==
Visa requirements for Tuvaluan nationals Tuvalu Visa not required / ESTA / eTA / eVisitor eVisa Visa available both on arrival or online Visa on arrival Visa required prior to arrival
