= Twenty-seventh Amendment of the Constitution of Ireland =

Amendment on birthright citizenship

- 11 June 2004
- To limit the right to Irish citizenship by birth

Results
| Choice | Votes | % |
|---|---|---|
| Yes | 1,427,520 | 79.17% |
| No | 375,695 | 20.83% |
| Valid votes | 1,803,215 | 98.89% |
| Invalid or blank votes | 20,219 | 1.11% |
| Total votes | 1,823,434 | 100.00% |
| Registered voters/turnout | 3,041,688 | 59.95% |

The Twenty-seventh Amendment of the Constitution Act 2004 (previously bill no. 15 of 2004) amended the Constitution of Ireland to limit the constitutional right to Irish citizenship of individuals born on the island of Ireland to the children of at least one Irish citizen and the children of at least one parent who is, at the time of the birth, entitled to Irish citizenship. It was approved by referendum on 11 June 2004 and signed into law on 24 June of the same year. It affected in part changes made to the Constitution by the Nineteenth Amendment of the Constitution of Ireland which was passed as part of the Good Friday Agreement.

== Changes to the text ==
A new Article 9.2 was inserted:

1° Notwithstanding any other provision of this Constitution, a person born in the island of Ireland, which includes its islands and seas, who does not have, at the time of the birth of that person, at least one parent who is an Irish citizen or entitled to be an Irish citizen is not entitled to Irish citizenship or nationality, unless provided for by law.
2° This section shall not apply to persons born before the date of the enactment of this section.

The former Article 9.2 was renumbered as Article 9.3.

== Background ==
Prior to 1999, the right to citizenship by reason of birth in Ireland existed in ordinary legislation. The only people who had a constitutional right to citizenship were those who were citizens of the Irish Free State when the constitution came into force. For those born after 1937, the Constitution stated that the "future acquisition and loss of Irish nationality and citizenship shall be determined in accordance with law". This changed in 1999 when, as part of the Nineteenth Amendment, the following clause was inserted into Article 2 of the Constitution:

It is the entitlement and birthright of every person born in the island of Ireland, which includes its islands and seas, to be part of the Irish Nation. That is also the entitlement of all persons otherwise qualified in accordance with law to be citizens of Ireland.

This provision was intended to ensure that people from Northern Ireland would not be deprived of Irish citizenship, but also created a constitutional right to citizenship by birth. Though immigration concerns did not feature much as an issue in the referendum campaign for the Nineteenth Amendment, it was given as an argument against in the Referendum Commission's leaflet:

"The new Article 2 will give a constitutional right of citizenship to anyone born in Ireland. This will make it very difficult to change the laws on citizenship and it may prevent the enactment of necessary laws to regulate immigration."

By 2002, it was reported that the number of births in Ireland's national maternity hospital had reached a 20-year high with 8,162 births, 15% of which were reported as being births to non-nationals.

The Minister for Justice at the time Michael McDowell said that between 40% and 50% of non-EU nationals who give birth in Ireland were doing so to gain Irish citizenship for their children.

In April 2004, an internal Department of Justice memo revealed that in August 2003, the Masters of Ireland's maternity hospitals had warned that pregnant women were arriving in Ireland from abroad with their "antenatal notes".

In October 2004, a European Court of Justice ruling (Case C-200/02) Chen v Home Secretary ruled that the non-EU parent of a child who is a citizen of the Union had a right to reside with that child in the EU.

== Campaign ==
The Twenty-seventh Amendment was introduced by the Fianna Fáil–Progressive Democrats coalition government of Bertie Ahern. It was also supported by Fine Gael (the largest opposition party) but they refused to campaign due to what they complained was insufficient consultation before the poll. The amendment was opposed by the Labour Party, the Green Party, and Sinn Féin, as well as the Irish Human Rights Commission, a statutory body, and the Irish Council for Civil Liberties, a civil society non-profit organisation. It was also opposed by Northern Ireland's SDLP, as Irish citizenship is an option for people born there.

The government presented the amendment as a common sense proposal that would close a constitutional loop-hole and allow Irish law to be brought into line with the rest of Europe. In 2004, no other nation of the European Union granted citizenship by birth in the same manner as Ireland.

Some criticisms of the amendment related merely to the manner in which it was proposed. In the lead-up to the referendum the Irish and British governments issued a joint statement saying that they did not regard the proposed constitutional change as affecting the British-Irish Agreement (this being the inter-governmental component of the Good Friday Agreement). The Democratic Unionist Party cited the amendment as evidence that the Agreement could be changed.

The referendum on the amendment was held on the same day as both European and local elections.

In the referendum, the amendment was ultimately approved, by a large majority of almost 80% in favour.

== Result ==
Twenty-seventh Amendment of the Constitution of Ireland referendum
| Choice | Votes | % |
|---|---|---|
| For | 1,427,520 | 79.17 |
| Against | 375,695 | 20.83 |
| Total | 1,803,215 | 100.00 |
| Valid votes | 1,803,215 | 98.89 |
| Invalid/blank votes | 20,219 | 1.11 |
| Total votes | 1,823,434 | 100.00 |
| Registered voters/turnout | 3,041,688 | 59.95 |

Although most Irish referendums count votes per Dáil constituency, this one was organised by city/county council area, the basis for the local elections being held simultaneously. Voters received different-coloured ballot papers for the referendum, city/county council election, and European Parliament election; all went into the same ballot box and were separated by colour once the boxes arrived at the count centre for the city/county. Not all voters received all ballots as the franchises differ.

Results by constituency
| Constituency | Electorate | Turnout (%) | Votes | | Proportion of votes | |
| Constituency | Electorate | Turnout (%) | Yes | No | Yes | No |
|---|---|---|---|---|---|---|
| County Carlow | 37,914 | 57.5% | 17,393 | 4,151 | 80.8% | 19.2% |
| County Cavan | 47,258 | 67.3% | 25,320 | 6,030 | 80.8% | 19.2% |
| County Clare | 83,351 | 64.6% | 42,822 | 10,329 | 80.6% | 19.4% |
| Cork City | 88,874 | 56.1% | 38,931 | 10,531 | 78.8% | 21.2% |
| County Cork | 265,657 | 61.7% | 127,992 | 33,805 | 79.2% | 20.8% |
| County Donegal | 116,125 | 62.2% | 52,985 | 17,990 | 74.7% | 25.3% |
| Dublin City | 336,795 | 53.2% | 138,685 | 39,323 | 78.0% | 22.0% |
| Dún Laoghaire–Rathdown | 148,125 | 55.3% | 57,869 | 23,740 | 71.0% | 29.0% |
| Fingal | 138,807 | 56.6% | 63,448 | 14,600 | 81.3% | 18.7% |
| Galway City | 41,925 | 50.3% | 15,849 | 5,045 | 75.9% | 24.1% |
| County Galway | 118,937 | 64.8% | 60,770 | 14,848 | 80.4% | 19.6% |
| County Kerry | 106,377 | 67.5% | 56,147 | 14,635 | 79.4% | 20.6% |
| County Kildare | 127,162 | 52.4% | 54,108 | 12,070 | 81.8% | 18.2% |
| County Kilkenny | 64,218 | 63.7% | 32,079 | 8,251 | 79.6% | 20.4% |
| County Laois | 46,775 | 65.8% | 24,809 | 5,549 | 81.8% | 18.2% |
| County Leitrim | 22,875 | 75.7% | 12,977 | 4,034 | 76.3% | 23.7% |
| Limerick City | 37,649 | 56.6% | 17,059 | 4,077 | 80.8% | 19.2% |
| County Limerick | 94,500 | 63.8% | 47,858 | 11,643 | 80.5% | 19.5% |
| County Longford | 27,029 | 71.3% | 15,970 | 2,958 | 84.4% | 15.6% |
| County Louth | 82,501 | 58.4% | 39,633 | 8,185 | 82.9% | 17.1% |
| County Mayo | 96,888 | 65.5% | 48,029 | 14,164 | 77.3% | 22.7% |
| County Meath | 116,300 | 54.4% | 52,291 | 10,535 | 83.3% | 16.7% |
| County Monaghan | 44,074 | 69.1% | 23,868 | 6,107 | 79.7% | 20.3% |
| County Offaly | 51,929 | 62.5% | 25,771 | 6,207 | 80.6% | 19.4% |
| County Roscommon | 45,398 | 68.1% | 24,269 | 6,191 | 79.7% | 20.3% |
| County Sligo | 46,861 | 68.9% | 23,405 | 8,499 | 73.4% | 26.6% |
| South Dublin | 175,139 | 52.7% | 75,510 | 16,403 | 82.2% | 17.8% |
| Tipperary North | 51,358 | 70.2% | 27,671 | 7,815 | 78.0% | 22.0% |
| Tipperary South | 61,518 | 67.8% | 32,246 | 8,557 | 79.1% | 20.9% |
| Waterford City | 29,290 | 60.0% | 14,113 | 3,321 | 81.0% | 19.0% |
| County Waterford | 45,687 | 64.1% | 23,301 | 5,671 | 80.5% | 19.5% |
| County Westmeath | 57,740 | 60.4% | 27,782 | 6,565 | 80.9% | 19.1% |
| County Wexford | 98,705 | 58.4% | 45,488 | 11,790 | 79.5% | 20.5% |
| County Wicklow | 87,947 | 60.8% | 41,072 | 12,076 | 77.3% | 22.7% |
| Total | 3,041,688 | 59.9% | 1,427,520 | 375,695 | 79.2% | 20.8% |

== Aftermath ==
The amendment was signed into law on 24 June 2004, after the referendum result had been certified by the High Court. On 29 September the government published a bill to amend nationality law within the scope of the revised constitutional parameters. This bill was signed into law on 15 December 2004 as the Irish Nationality and Citizenship Act 2004.

In December 2004, The Master of Ireland's National Maternity Hospital Dr Declan Keane told irishhealth.com that prior to the referendum, 16% of the deliveries at the hospital were to non-EU women and five per cent were to women from other EU countries. He said that since the referendum, this figure had been reversed, with 16% of births now accounted for by mothers from other EU countries and five per cent to mothers from outside the EU.

== See also ==
- Irish nationality law
- Articles 2 and 3 of the Constitution of Ireland
