= Samoan nationality law =

Citizenship Act 2004

Parliament of Samoa
- Long title: An act to make provision with respect to the status of Samoan citizenship
- Citation: No. 3/2004
- Enacted by: Government of Samoa
- Commenced: 21 January 2004
- Administered by: Ministry of the Prime Minister

Repeals
- Citizenship Act 1972

Related legislation
- Citizenship Investment Act 2015
- Status: Current legislation

Samoan nationality law is regulated by the 1962 Constitution of Samoa, as amended; the Citizenship Act 2004, and its revisions; the Citizenship Investment Act 2015; and international agreements entered into by the Samoan government. These laws determine who is, or is eligible to be, a national of Samoa. The legal means to acquire nationality, formal legal membership in a nation, differ from the domestic relationship of rights and obligations between a national and the nation, known as citizenship. Samoan nationality is typically obtained either on the principle of jus soli (by birth in Samoa) or under the rules of jus sanguinis (by birth abroad to parents with Samoan nationality). It can be granted to persons who have lived in the country for a specific period of time, who have contributed to the country's development, or who have an affiliation to the country through naturalisation.

== Acquiring Samoan nationality ==
Nationality in Samoa is acquired at birth or later in life by naturalisation.

=== By birth ===
Birthright nationality applies to:

- Persons born in Samoa to at least one parent who is a Samoan national;
- Persons born abroad to at least one parent or grandparent, who was a native-born Samoan national; or
- Persons born abroad to at least one parent or grandparent, who was a Samoan national and who was born abroad but had lived within the national territory for three years at the time of the child's birth.

=== By naturalisation ===
Regular naturalisation in Samoa is acquired by submitting an application to the Minister with the responsibility for the administration of immigration. Applicants must provide evidence that they are of good character, have familiarity with Samoan civics, intend to live in Samoa, and have resided within the territory for five years. A special naturalisation process for persons who have performed distinguished service to the public or nation is permitted for economic development or sporting achievement. The program requires a minimum net worth of $2.5m tālā (equivalent to $1,000,000 USD in 2020) and an investment of $4m tālā (equivalent to $1,400,000 USD in 2020). It also requires a 3 year established residency and thereafter an annual physical presence in Samoa of fifteen days. Naturalisation is also available to:

- Persons who are born in Samoa (or on a Samoan ship) and deemed to be stateless may be granted nationality by a Cabinet member or Minister;
- Adoptees;
- Spouses of Samoans who have been married and resided in the territory for five years; or
- Persons (including their family members) who have made a significant financial investment to the development of the country.

== Loss of nationality ==
Samoan nationals may renounce their nationality provided they have legal majority and capacity and have obtained other nationality. Denaturalisation may occur if a person obtained nationality through fraud, false representation, or concealment; if they have committed disloyal or treasonous acts; or if a naturalised Samoan has obtained residence abroad. In the case of a person who has acquired nationality by investment, denaturalisation can occur if they failed to make the required investment or maintain the required net worth.

== Dual nationality ==
Since 2004, Samoa has allowed dual nationality.

== History ==
=== Pre-colonisation (1722-1899) ===
Samoan administration was arranged under the traditional Faʻamatai (clan) system around villages. Political authority was granted to a paramount chief through ruling villages and title holders who represented designated territories and kinship networks. The political and ceremonial system controlled councils, marriage, war, and affairs of the inhabitants. The Dutch navigator, Jacob Roggeveen first sighted the Samoan Islands in 1722 and later the French noted them in 1768, giving them the name Navigator Islands. No permanent European settlements occurred until John Williams of the London Missionary Society established a mission in the islands in 1830. Charles Wilkes led the United States Exploring Expedition, which surveyed the islands and drafted commercial regulations in 1839 and in 1845, George Pritchard arrived as the British consul. The German trading firm J.C. Godeffroy & Sohn began commercial operations in the Samoan archipelago in 1857. German expansion on the island included oil extraction and founding the first coconut plantations. Struggle for control of the area by Western powers eventually led to the Tripartite Convention of 1899, in which the United States, Great Britain, and Germany agreed to partition the islands into German Samoa and American Samoa.

=== German protectorate (1899-1920) ===
Germany established an administration under the Governor Wilhelm Solf in 1900, which utilized traditional leaders to implement policies. He appointed Mataʻafa Iosefo as paramount chief and created a bipartisan council of advisors made of up chiefs of both royal lines and district headmen to give guidance on policy. Under the terms of the German Colonial Act of 1888, German colonies were not part of the federal union, but they were also not considered foreign. Thus, laws that were extended to the colonies sometimes treated residents as nationals and other times as foreigners. Native subjects in the colonies were not considered to be German, but were allowed to naturalise. Naturalisation required ten years residence in the territory and proof of self-employment. It was automatically bestowed upon all members of a family, meaning children and wives derived the nationality of the husband. The Nationality Law of 1913 changed the basis for acquiring German nationality from domicile to patrilineality, but did not alter derivative nationality. At the outbreak of World War I, in 1914, the Samoa Expeditionary Force landed on and occupied German Samoa. The German governor surrendered and a military administration was established by New Zealand.

=== New Zealand mandated or trust territory (1920-1962) ===
At the end of the war in 1919, the League of Nations established four class C Mandates in the Pacific for the former German colonies. New Zealand was assigned the islands of Western Samoa. Provisions given by the League of Nations in a 1923 resolution regarding the mandates included that native inhabitants did not possess the nationality of the administrating nation. Under British law, mandated territories were outside the Crown's dominions, meaning British nationality laws did not apply to natives, but only to British subjects born to British fathers who may have been domiciled in a mandated place. (Note: A commission was convened in 1946 to review nationality of the inhabitants in former German colonies. It concluded that inhabitants of "C"-type mandates did not acquire British nationality and if they had been German nationals under the terms of the 1913 Nationality law, they became stateless when Germany abandoned its territories. According to D. P. O'Connell, they were deemed to be "lacking nationality but enjoying an administrative status analogous to that of inhabitants of British protectorates".) However, in 1923, New Zealand amended the 1921 Samoa Act with the specific intent to provide naturalisation to Samoans as British subjects. That same year, New Zealand adopted the British Nationality and Status of Aliens Act 1914, except for the provisions that naturalised people from throughout the empire were automatically British subjects in New Zealand.

A common nationality code for use across the British Empire had been proposed in 1911, at the Imperial Conference. It was enacted as the 1914 British Nationality Act and allowed local jurisdictions in the self-governing Dominions to continue regulating nationality in their territories, but also established an imperial nationality scheme across the realm. The uniform law, which went into effect on 1 January 1915, required a married woman to derive her nationality from her spouse, meaning if he was British, she was also, and if he was foreign, so was she. It stipulated that upon loss of nationality of a husband, a wife could declare that she wished to remain British. It also provided that if a marriage had terminated, through death or divorce, a British-born national who had lost her status through marriage could reacquire British nationality through naturalisation without meeting a residency requirement. The statute reiterated common law provisions for natural-born persons born within the realm on or after the effective date. By using the word person, the statute nullified legitimacy requirements for jus soli nationals, meaning illegitimate children could derive their nationality maternally. For those born abroad on or after the effective date, legitimacy was still required, and could only be derived by a child from a British father (one generation), who was natural-born or naturalised.

From 1923, these provisions went into effect in New Zealand. Though the 1923 Act was repealed in 1928, the British Nationality and Status of Aliens (in New Zealand) Act of that year, contained provisions that Cook Islanders, New Zealanders, and Samoans were defined as being within the British dominions and allegiance, and that they were either born as British subjects or entitled to be naturalised based upon meeting naturalisation and residency requirements. The 1928 Act also incorporated provisions that people naturalised anywhere in the empire were automatically British subjects in New Zealand. After the World Conference on the Codification of International Law held in The Hague in 1930, discussion commenced throughout the empire as to whether laws should be modified to conform with the provisions to prevent statelessness in the Convention on Certain Questions Relating to the Conflict of Nationality Laws. Britain modified its laws to prevent women from becoming stateless in 1933, by allowing a married woman to retain her nationality if her husband's native country did not automatically give her his nationality. In 1935, New Zealand passed legislation to allow married women who might become aliens by marriage to retain their British nationality while residing its territory. In 1946, New Zealand's parliament passed the British Nationality and Status of Aliens in New Zealand Amendment Act, granting women individual nationality.

Two years later, the British Nationality and New Zealand Citizenship Act 1948 ended the practice of granting Samoans the status of British subject from birth. The new law created New Zealand nationality as separate from British nationality. In the sections dealing with Western Samoa (16 (3) and 7(1)), the Act provided that British subjects who had been previously born in Samoa, automatically became nationals of New Zealand and children born thereafter to these subjects could derive New Zealand nationality through their fathers. It stipulated that wives of persons who were conferred nationality, or would have obtained nationality but did not because of death, on 1 January 1949 could apply for registration as a New Zealand National. Samoans born after 1949, who were not British subjects or who had no other nationality, under the terms of the Western Samoa New Zealand Protected Persons Order 1950 had diplomatic protection as New Zealand Protected Persons, a status which was similar to British Protected Persons. Under that status, a Samoan could only claim New Zealand nationality if their father was a New Zealand national, who had been born in New Zealand. New Zealand Protected Persons, as they were not aliens, were unable to naturalise.

As plans proceeded for Western Samoa to gain independence and terminate the Trusteeship, the Citizenship of Western Samoa Ordinance was adopted in 1959. It provided that children born in the territory to native-born Samoan fathers would automatically derive Samoan nationality. Children previously born abroad to Samoan fathers could declare their desire to be Samoan and take an oath of allegiance within ten months of the effective date of the Ordinance. Persons, born in the territory to non-Samoans, who had lived for a cumulative period of at least three years, out of four years of established residency, were conferred nationality until they reached the age of twenty-one. After reaching majority, these nationals had to take an oath of allegiance and renounce any foreign nationality. Foreign-born inhabitants of Western Samoa who had resided in the territory for five years could opt for Samoan nationality after the effective date by declaring their intent and taking a loyalty oath. After the effective date of the Ordinance, children born abroad to native-born or naturalised Samoan nationals derived the nationality of their father for one generation, unless they returned to Samoa as a resident. Foreign wives of Samoan nationals automatically obtained their nationality from their husbands. The Ordinance did not permit dual nationality, except in the case of minor children.

=== Post-independence (1962-present) ===
Upon gaining its independence on 1 January 1962 as the Independent State of Western Samoa, all persons who had been citizens, as described in the Citizenship of Western Samoa Ordinance 1959 automatically became nationals of Samoa. There were no provisions in the Western Samoa Act 1961 for Samoans to cease to be New Zealand nationals at independence. The Citizenship Act 1972, reiterated provisions in the 1959 Ordinance, but provided that if one had dual nationality, and exercised any rights of New Zealand citizenship, Western Samoan nationality could be lost. In 1982, Falemaʻi Lesa, challenged a deportation order from New Zealand on the basis that she had derived New Zealand nationality through her Samoan father, when the country was under the UN Mandate. The Judicial Committee of the Privy Council of New Zealand ruled that persons born in Samoa during the Mandate period were natural-born British subjects, under the 1923 amendment to the Samoa Act and the 1928 Nationality Act of New Zealand, which was in effect until 1948.

To prevent acquisition of nationality for all of these persons, the New Zealand Parliament enacted the Citizenship (Western Samoa) Act 1982, as a Protocol addended to the 1962 Treaty of Friendship between New Zealand and Western Samoa. Except for Lesa, the Act disavowed that Samoans had ever been New Zealand nationals, but granted any Samoan national currently in New Zealand on 14 September 1982 or who subsequently immigrated and obtained permanent residence in New Zealand to apply for New Zealand nationality. The action was controversial and rights groups argued that the new law was racist because it required Samoans to give up their birthright to New Zealand nationality. Discussion continued for years about repealing the legislation and imposed restrictive quotas for Samoans wishing to immigrate to New Zealand.

In 1997, a constitutional amendment changed the name of the country from Western Samoa to Samoa. In 2004, the Citizenship Act was amended to eliminate gender disparities. At that time, women were granted individual nationality, children were allowed to derive nationality from their mothers, and spouses were afforded equality in passing their nationality to their spouse. The amendment also removed restrictions on dual nationality. In 2015, Samoa launched an immigrant investment program, to allow individuals and their families to gain nationality by contributing to the development of the nation.

== Samoans and Commonwealth citizenship ==
Samoan nationals were not part of the Commonwealth of Nations at independence. They joined in 1970, but nationals of Western Samoa were not entitled to Commonwealth citizenship, until 1980, with the passage of the Papua New Guinea, Western Samoa and Nauru Miscellaneous Provisions Act 1980. Commonwealth membership entitled Samoans to certain rights in the United Kingdom—notably the right to vote and stand for election if legally resident in the United Kingdom.
