= Sino-Indonesian Dual Nationality Treaty =

1955 treaty between China and Indonesia

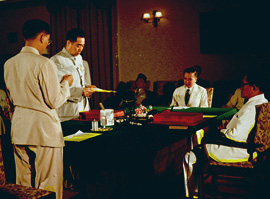
- Zhou Enlai (standing, second from left) and Sunario (seated, right) meet at the 1955 Asian–African Conference.
- Signed: 22 April 1955
- Location: Bandung, Indonesia
- Effective: 20 January 1960
- Condition: Exchange of the instruments of ratification in Beijing
- Expiration: 20 January 1980
- Signatories: Zhou Enlai (China) and Sunario (Indonesia)
- Parties: People's Republic of China and Indonesia
- Languages: Chinese and Indonesian

Full text
- Agreement on the Issue of Dual Nationality between the Republic of Indonesia and the People's Republic of China at Wikisource

The Agreement on the Issue of Dual Nationality between the Republic of Indonesia and the People's Republic of China, (Note: Indonesian: Persetujuan Perjanjian antara Republik Indonesia dan Republik Rakyat Tiongkok Mengenai Soal Dwikewarganegaraan; simplified Chinese: 中华人民共和国和印度尼西亚共和国关于双重国籍问题的条约; traditional Chinese: 中華人民共和國和印度尼西亞共和國關於雙重國籍問題的條約; pinyin: Zhōnghuá Rénmín Gònghéguó hé Yìndùníxīyǎ Gònghéguó guānyú shuāngchóng guójí wèntí de tiáoyuē) better known as the Sino-Indonesian Dual Nationality Treaty, was a bilateral agreement between the People's Republic of China and the Republic of Indonesia that forced Chinese Indonesians with dual nationality of both countries to choose citizenship of just one. It was signed by Zhou Enlai, Premier and Foreign Minister of China, and Sunario, Foreign Minister of Indonesia, on 22 April 1955 during the Asian–African Conference in Bandung. Following ratification by both parties, the treaty came into force on 20 January 1960 after an exchange of the instruments of ratification in Beijing.

== Background ==
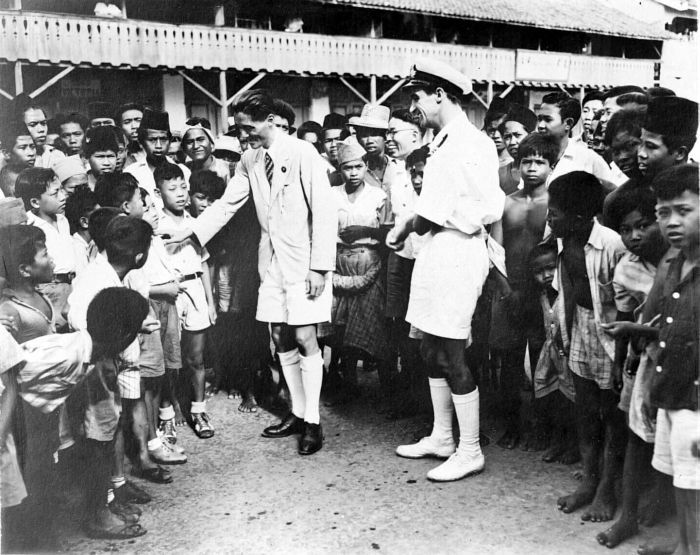
A Chinese consul visits his constituents in Makassar, South Sulawesi.

The last complete census of the Dutch East Indies was held in 1930 and counted 1,233,000 self-identified ethnic Chinese living in the colony. Of this population, nearly two-thirds were born in the Indies, while the remaining one-third were new immigrants from China. Under the Netherlands Citizenship Act of 1910, ethnic Chinese who were born of domiciled parents were considered Dutch subjects even if they were not Dutch citizens. The law followed the principle of jus soli, or right of the soil. Additionally, the Manchu government of China's Qing dynasty enacted a citizenship law on 28 March 1909 which claimed "every legal or extra-legal child of a Chinese father or mother, regardless of birthplace," as a Chinese citizen according to the principle of jus sanguinis, or right of blood. This principle had previously been taken for granted by the Chinese, and it meant that ethnic Chinese born in the Indies were subjects of both the Dutch and Chinese governments.

As nationalistic ethnic Chinese protested against "forced naturalization", they demanded the protection of Chinese consuls. However, as an exchange for consular representation in the Indies, both governments signed the Consular Convention of 1911 which limited the jurisdiction of Chinese consuls to those who were not also Dutch subjects. The convention did not explicitly solve the problem of dual nationality as notes attached to the document indicated it was not meant to define citizenship. Chiang Kai-shek's Republic of China government reaffirmed jus sanguinis through a new citizenship act in 1929. It also refused to sign onto the 1930 Hague Convention on Nationality based on Article 4 of the document, which stipulates that "a State may not afford diplomatic protection to one of its nationals against a state whose nationality such person also possesses".

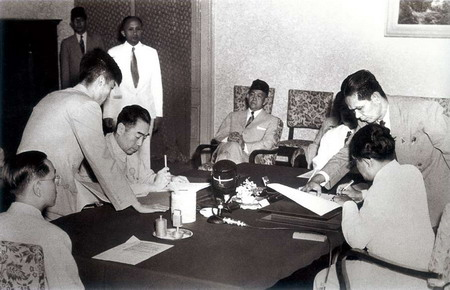
Chinese and Indonesian foreign ministers Zhou Enlai and Sunario sign the treaty.

== Ratification and entry into force ==
=== Delays in Indonesia ===
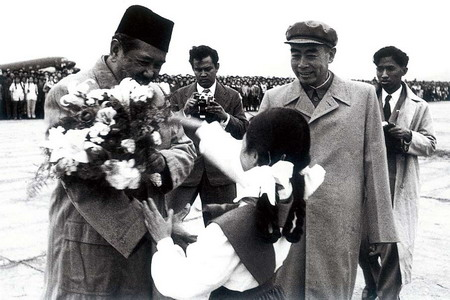
Ali Sastroamidjojo is greeted by Zhou Enlai upon his arrival in Beijing, 26 May 1955.

After the treaty's signing, Prime Minister of Indonesia Ali Sastroamidjojo met with his Chinese counterpart in Beijing on 3 June. In an exchange of notes meant to supplement the ratification process, both men addressed objections which have been made against the treaty. The document made provisions for a joint committee to be established to plan the treaty's enforcement and elaborated on interpretations of the treaty. At the time of the resignation of Ali Sastroamidjojo's cabinet on 24 July, it had made no further progress on the treaty. The next Cabinet was formed by a coalition of parties which had opposed the treaty; it tabled the matter until after the legislative election in September.

Ali Sastroamidjojo returned as Prime Minister in March 1956, but his new coalition included several members of the opposition. Opposition of the treaty from Catholic and Protestant parties became apparent during a June working session with the foreign affairs committee of the People's Representative Council (Dewan Perwakilan Rakyat, DPR). The treaty was endorsed by the Cabinet on 3 July, and a draft bill was forwarded to the DPR in early August. Minister of Justice Muljatno further urged the DPR in December to ratify the treaty quickly, but initial discussions of the treaty did not begin until March 1957. Ratification was further delayed when the Cabinet was forced to resign following a rebellion in Sumatra. The DPR entered a six-week recess in April and was reopened after a new Cabinet under Prime Minister Djuanda Kartawidjaja took office. After the Djuanda Cabinet approved the treaty for a second time in August, Foreign Minister Subandrio personally urged the DPR to make its passage a high priority on the legislative agenda. In an October report to the Central Committee of Baperki, an ethnic Chinese political party, Chinese Indonesian DPR member Siauw Giok Tjhan attributed the delay of ratification to the frequent changes of the Cabinet.

The DPR conducted a final debate on the treaty on 17 December 1957. Members of Masyumi motioned to postpone the debate until after the passage of a new citizenship law, but it was defeated by a 39–110 vote. Representatives of Masyumi and PSI then walked out of the session, and the treaty was ratified by a unanimous vote of the remaining delegates.

=== Opposition ===
One provision of the 1955 exchange between Ali Sastroamidjojo and Zhou Enlai sought to address ambiguities about the status of ethnic Chinese citizens of Indonesia outside the time frame outlined in the treaty:

The Government of the People's Republic of China and the Government of Republic of Indonesia agree that among those who are at the same time citizens of Indonesia and of the People's Republic of China there is a certain group who may be considered to have only one citizenship and not to have dual citizenship, because, in the opinion of the Government of the Republic of Indonesia, their social and political position demonstrates that they have spontaneously (in an implicit manner) renounced the citizenship of the People's Republic of China. Persons included in the above-mentioned group, because they have only citizenship, are not required to choose their citizenship under the provisions of the dual nationality treaty. If they so desire, a certificate stating their position may be given to such persons.

When the provisions of the Beijing exchange became public, many Indonesians began to speculate who would be considered exempt from the requirement of formally choosing a citizenship. Indonesian newspapers learned from their "informed sources" and "sources near to the Cabinet" that the issue had been raised by Ali Sastroamidjojo's cabinet prior to the Prime Minister's departure for Beijing. It is believed the discussion came about because Minister of Health Lie Kiat Teng refused to participate in another option procedure. Although unconfirmed officially, these Cabinet sources reported that ethnic Chinese employees of the Indonesian government would be exempt from the procedure.

=== Chinese pressure for implementation ===
In China, the Standing Committee of the National People's Congress ratified the treaty on 30 December 1957.

== See also ==
- Indonesian nationality law
- Nationality Law of the People's Republic of China
- People's Republic of China – Indonesia relations
