= Sue v Hill =

Australian High Court case

- Court: High Court of Australia
- Full case name: Sue and Hill and Another; Sharples and Hill and Another
- Decided: 23 June 1999
- Citations: [1999] HCA 30, (1999) 199 CLR 462.
- Transcripts: 11 May 1999; 12 May 1999; 13 May 1999

Court membership
- Judges sitting: Chief Justice Murray Gleeson; Justice Mary Gaudron; Justice Michael McHugh; Justice William Gummow; Justice Michael Kirby; Justice Kenneth Hayne; Justice Ian Callinan

Case opinions
- The United Kingdom is a "foreign power" for the purposes of section 44(i) of the Constitution. Hence, a citizen of the United Kingdom is incapable of being a senator (by Gleeson, Guadron, Gummon and Hayne; McHugh, Kirby and Callinan not deciding); The High Court (sitting as the Court of Disputed Claims) had jurisdiction over the case (by Gleeson, Guadron, Gummon and Hayne; McHugh, Kirby and Callinan dissenting); The jurisdiction of the Court of Disputed Returns, as conferred on the High Court, involves the exercise of judicial power and is not inconsistent with the separation of powers (by Gleeson, Guadron, Gummon and Hayne)

Sue v Hill was an Australian court case decided in the High Court of Australia on 23 June 1999. It concerned a dispute over the apparent return of a candidate, Heather Hill, to the Australian Senate in the 1998 federal election. The result was challenged on the basis that Hill was a dual citizen of the United Kingdom and Australia, and that section 44(i) of the Constitution of Australia prevents any person who is the citizen of a "foreign power" from being elected to the Parliament of Australia. The High Court found that the United Kingdom is a foreign power to Australia.

== Background ==
=== Australian independence from the United Kingdom ===
The degree to which Australia is and has been independent from the United Kingdom is a topic of much debate. The common view is that there has been an evolutionary process by which Australia has gained more and more independence.

The 1926 Imperial Conference resulted in the Royal and Parliamentary Titles Act 1927, and the Balfour Declaration 1926, which granted the Dominions equal status to the United Kingdom. However, laws passed by the Parliament of the United Kingdom still had force in Australia, and laws passed by Australian parliaments would be invalid if they contradicted United Kingdom laws (the doctrine of repugnancy). The Statute of Westminster Adoption Act 1942 ended the doctrine of repugnancy, and provided that United Kingdom laws would only have force in Australia at Australia's request.

The Australia Act 1986 ended all legal ties between Australia and the United Kingdom. The Act, enacted by the Parliament of Australia and the Parliament of the United Kingdom, ended the ability of the United Kingdom to make laws for Australia or employ the doctrine of repugnancy, and stopped all remaining avenues of appeal to the Privy Council from Australian courts, unless authorised by the High Court of Australia.

=== 1998 election ===
Heather Hill, a woman with Australian and United Kingdom dual citizenship, who was born in London in 1960 and moved to Australia in 1971, was a Queensland candidate for the Australian Senate for One Nation who contested the 1998 federal election. At the election on 3 October 1998, Hill received 295,903 first preference votes and was accordingly elected without the need to consider the distribution of preferences.

Henry Sue, a voter from Queensland, disputed the election of Hill and filed a petition under the Commonwealth Electoral Act 1918 in the High Court of Australia, sitting in its capacity as the Court of Disputed Returns. Sue argued that on the date of Hill's nomination to the Senate she was still a citizen of the United Kingdom and thus, because of the operation of section 44 of the Australian Constitution, was ineligible to be elected to the Parliament of Australia.

Terry Sharples, a former One Nation candidate who had stood for the Senate in the 1998 election as an independent candidate, made a similar petition. Because both cases involved constitutional questions, and were substantially identical, they were heard together from 11–13 May 1999.

== Arguments ==
=== Eligibility of Hill ===
Sue argued that Hill was ineligible because of section 44(i) of the Constitution of Australia, which provides that:

Any person who ... is under any acknowledgement of allegiance, obedience, or adherence to a foreign power, or is a subject or a citizen or entitled to the rights or privileges of a subject or citizen of a foreign power: ... shall be incapable of being chosen or of sitting as a senator or a member of the House of Representatives.

Sue argued that, since Australia was now an independent nation, the United Kingdom should properly be regarded as a foreign power.

Sue also raised the example of section 51(xix) of the Australian Constitution, which grants the Commonwealth Parliament the power to make laws with respect to "naturalization and aliens", and argued that since the word "aliens" in that section had come to be regarded to include people from the United Kingdom, so too should the word "foreign power" be understood to include the United Kingdom.

The Commonwealth Government decided to intervene in the case, and the Solicitor-General of Australia, David Bennett, also argued that the United Kingdom was a "foreign power".

Hill, on the other hand, argued that: "The United Kingdom was not a foreign power at Federation, is not a foreign power now and never will be a foreign power while the Constitution remains in its present form." Hill said that because the Constitution was enacted as part of a statute of the British Imperial Parliament it derived its validity from British law. Further, she argued that because section 128 of the Australian Constitution provides that the Constitution cannot be changed except in accordance with that section, then only a constitutional referendum could change this special status of the United Kingdom, and the Australia Act had no effect, "so long as the United Kingdom retained any residual influence upon legislative, executive or judicial processes in Australia, it could not be regarded as 'foreign' to Australia."

=== Jurisdiction ===
Another question in the case was whether the High Court, sitting as the Court of Disputed Returns, had jurisdiction to hear the case. Hill argued that because of the structure of the Commonwealth Electoral Act 1918, the court could not hear the case. She argued that elections could not be disputed by petition if the dispute was about the eligibility of a candidate, as another provision of the Act meant that it would require a resolution of the relevant house of Parliament, the Senate in this case.

The government argued that the sections of the Act dealing with disputation by petition encompassed any question about the validity of an election, including the eligibility of a candidate, and that the sections should be interpreted broadly. Sue made a similar argument, saying that the sections allowing disputes by petition and the sections allowing disputes by the relevant house of Parliament were not mutually exclusive and that elections could be disputed by either the Parliament or the people.

=== Separation of powers ===
Hill also argued that if the Electoral Act actually appeared to confer jurisdiction on the court, it was nevertheless invalid, as the determination of disputes about election results is a non-judicial function. Also, the doctrine of separation of powers meant that non-judicial power cannot be conferred on a Chapter III Court such as the High Court.

Both the government and Sue argued that two previous decisions, which may have among other things suggested that determining disputed returns is a non-judicial function, were incorrect. They said that the jurisdiction conferred by the Act required the court to consider real issues and not "abstract or hypothetical questions". They also said that the Act gave the court a wide discretion and allowed it to function in a manner entirely consistent with the exercise of judicial power.

== Judgment ==
The High court ruled that senator-elect Hill had not been duly elected because at the time of her election she was a subject or citizen of a foreign power.

Five judgments were delivered, with Chief Justice Gleeson and justices Gummow and Hayne writing a joint judgement, and justices Gaudron, McHugh, Kirby and Callinan writing individual judgements.

=== Jurisdiction ===
Gaudron, and jointly Gleeson, Gummow and Hayne, decided that the Commonwealth Electoral Act 1918 validly conferred the jurisdiction to determine disputed elections on the High Court, in its capacity as the Court of Disputed Returns. They said that if Hill's argument about the structure of the Act were correct, there would be the odd result that the court could hear disputes about a candidate's eligibility under the Act itself (which imposes certain requirements for candidates), but it would not be able to hear disputes about a candidate's eligibility under the Constitution. They also said that if only a house of Parliament could dispute a candidate's constitutional eligibility, then in the time it took for that house to determine the issue, an ineligible candidate would be able to participate in the business of that house, including passing laws and other activities.

The four judges then went on to decide that the jurisdiction involved an exercise of judicial power, mentioning an earlier decision of Justice Isaacs, in which he had taken a functional approach, and determined that some functions, when conferred upon a legislative or executive body, can involve the exercise of non-judicial power, but the same functions when conferred on a judicial body involve the exercise of judicial power. The four judges found that the powers conferred on the court, to take evidence and compel witnesses and such, when vested in a judicial body such as the court, involved the exercise of judicial power. As such, the jurisdiction did not offend the separation of powers.

=== Foreign power ===
On the important issue of whether the United Kingdom was a "foreign power", only Gaudron, and jointly Gleeson, Gummow and Hayne, decided the matter, the other three judges having already found that the court did not have jurisdiction to hear the case. All four judges deciding did find that the United Kingdom was a "foreign power", because it no longer retained any legislative, executive or judicial influence over Australia. Gleeson, Gummow and Hayne said that the question was:

not about whether Australia's relationships with that power are friendly or not, close or distant, or meet any other qualitative description. Rather, the words invite attention to questions of international and domestic sovereignty.

Thus, the question would revolve around legal connections, and not around "Australia's strong historical and emotional ties with the United Kingdom."

They first considered whether the United Kingdom had any legislative power over Australia. Section 1 of the Australia Act 1986 provides that:

No Act of the Parliament of the United Kingdom passed after the commencement of this Act shall extend, or be deemed to extend, to the Commonwealth, to a State or to a Territory as part of the law of the Commonwealth, of the State or of the Territory.

They held that this section completely removed any power held by the United Kingdom to exercise legislative power over Australia. Some commentators had suggested that section 1 of the Australia Act could pose constitutional problems in the United Kingdom, because of A. V. Dicey's proposition that the Parliament cannot restrict its future actions. To this, Gleeson, Gummow and Hayne said:

Provisions such as s 1 may present doctrinal questions for the constitutional law of the United Kingdom, in particular for the dogma associated with Dicey's views as to the sovereignty of the Parliament at Westminster. Professor Sir William Wade pointed out more than forty years ago that Dicey never explained how he reconciled his assertions that Westminster could destroy or transfer sovereignty and the proposition that it could not bind future Parliaments. The effect in the United Kingdom of any amendment or repeal by the United Kingdom Parliament of s 1 would be for those adjudicating upon the constitutional law of that country. But whatever effect the courts of the United Kingdom may give to an amendment or repeal of the 1986 UK Act, Australian courts would be obliged to give their obedience to s 1 of the statute passed by the Parliament of the Commonwealth.

Thus they decided that the position in Australia was not affected at all by the position in the United Kingdom, and for Australian purposes, the United Kingdom has no legislative power over Australia.

Similarly they decided that the United Kingdom could not exercise any judicial power over Australia, with the end of appeals to the Judicial Committee of the Privy Council, and the court's previous decision, in Kirmani v Captain Cook Cruises Pty Ltd (No 2) that the limited purpose of a certificate of appeal, was spent and that it would never again grant a certificate of appeal. They also decided that no executive power existed over Australia, as although the sovereign monarch of Australia and the sovereign monarch of the United Kingdom are the same person, it had been accepted for a long time that the monarch acts in Australian matters on the advice of Australian ministers, and does not accept the advice of United Kingdom ministers in Australian matters at all.

Ultimately, they concluded that the United Kingdom was a distinct sovereign power and a distinct legal personality from Australia, and as such was a "foreign power" for the purposes of section 44 of the Australian Constitution.

=== Hill's renunciation ===
The decision noted in paragraph 176 that an Australian having dual citizenship must take some step to renounce his or her former citizenship before he or she can be treated under Australian law as having renounced it, and noted in paragraph 104 that Hill had on 18 November 1998 become aware of steps that could be taken to renounce her British citizenship, and had taken steps to effect the renunciation on the following day. The election, however, had taken place on 3 October 1998, on which date Hill was still a dual national.

The High Court also ruled that dual citizenship on its own is not enough to disqualify someone under section 44(i). At paragraph 176, the High Court makes the point that a person must take reasonable steps to renounce their non-Australian citizenship. If renunciation is not possible, for example by either the laws of the foreign power not permitting it or the process being unreasonable, then the person will not be disqualified by operation of section 44(i).

== Consequences ==
The court declared that Hill was not validly elected at the 1998 federal election. However, they did not declare the whole election invalid, acting on an earlier decision of the court, because although no effect could be given to voters' preferences for Hill, their other preferences were not invalid, and those could be used to determine who should be elected in Hill's stead. The court did not reach a definite decision about what action should be taken, remitting that question to a lower court. Eventually, Len Harris, the number two candidate on the One Nation ticket, was elected in Hill's stead, taking up his seat on 1 July 1999.

The invalidation of Hill's election caused some controversy in Australian political life. Hill herself viewed the challenge to her election as an attempt by big business and the rich to destroy her, as revenge for One Nation's critique of them during the election campaign. One Australian Broadcasting Corporation correspondent observed the irony that One Nation, a populist nationalist party, was "now suspected of not being quite Australian enough". Australian Greens Senator Bob Brown, despite being politically opposed to One Nation, attacked the decision for disenfranchising the people who had voted for Hill.

Aside from this immediate effect, the case represented a clear recognition that the Australia Acts 1986 finally and completely ended all legal ties between the United Kingdom and Australia, and that Australia has been a fully independent and sovereign nation in its own right since at least 3 March 1986, when the Act came into force. Some commentators have criticised the evolutionary approach adopted by the court, and the court's resultant failure to find a certain date on which Australia became independent, arguing that the distinction is more than merely symbolic and could have real consequences. However, even Justice Callinan, who questioned the evolutionary approach in this case, affirmed in a later case (Attorney-General Western Australia v Marquet) that the effect of the Australia Acts in finally recognising independence could not be doubted.

== See also ==
- Re Canavan, a court case regarding the eligibility of seven members of Parliament who unknowingly held dual citizenship
