= Colonial Sugar Refining Co Ltd v Attorney-General (Cth) =

Judgement of the High Court of Australia

- Court: High Court of Australia
- Decided: 22 October 1912
- Citations: [1912] HCA 94, (1912) 15 CLR 182

Court membership
- Judges sitting: Griffith CJ, Barton, Isaacs & Higgins JJ

Case opinions
- (4:0) The Royal Commission Act was valid (2:2) the Royal commission could only compel evidence on matters within the power of the Commonwealth per Griffith CJ and Barton J

Attorney-General (Cth) v Colonial Sugar Refining Co Ltd
- Court: Privy Council
- Decided: 17 December 1913
- Citations: [1913] UKPC 76, [1914] AC 237; [1913] UKPCHCA 4, (1913) 17 CLR 644

Court membership
- Judges sitting: Viscount Haldane LC, Lord Dunedin, Lord Shaw & Lord Moulton.

Case opinions
- The Royal Commission Act was invalid

Colonial Sugar Refining Co Ltd v Attorney-General (Cth), is the only case in which the High Court issued a certificate under section 74 of the Constitution to permit an appeal to the Privy Council on a constitutional question. The Privy Council did not answer the question asked by the High Court, and the court never issued another certificate of appeal.

== Background ==
The Commonwealth established a Royal Commission to inquire into the sugar industry in Australia. Colonial Sugar Refining Co Ltd operated sugar mills and refineries, principally in Australia and Fiji. The Royal Commission had summoned the general manager and directors of Colonial Sugar Refining Co Ltd to testify and produce documents, including a list of documents to be produced and questions they would be asked. Colonial Sugar Refining Co Ltd sought a declaration in the High Court that the Royal Commissions Act 1902-1912 was invalid.

== The decision of the High Court ==
In separate judgments, each of the judges upheld the validity of the Royal Commission Act. What split the court however was the question of whether the Royal Commission could inquire into matters that might be the subject of an amendment to the Constitution.

=== Griffith CJ & Barton J ===
In separate judgments, Griffith CJ & Barton J took a narrow view of the powers of the Royal Commission, applying the reserved powers doctrine. Their Honours held that the Commission could not lawfully ask questions, or demand the production of documents, relevant solely to:

- The internal management of the affairs of the company;
- The operations of the company outside the Commonwealth, except in so far as they related to the conditions of carrying on the sugar industry irrespective of the persons by whom it was carried on;
- Matters relating to the value of particular parts of the property of the company, except such parts as were actually and directly employed in the production and manufacture of sugar within the Commonwealth;
- Details of salaries paid to officers of the company, except so far as they were relevant to the actual cost of such production and manufacture.

=== Isaacs & Higgins JJ ===
In separate judgments, Isaacs & Higgins JJ took a much broader view of the incidental power under the Constitution to make inquiries with a view to the exercise of any other functions of the Commonwealth, including the power to seek approval for an amendment of the constitution.

=== The certificate ===
Section 74 of the constitution provided that:

No appeal shall be permitted to the Queen in Council from a decision of the High Court upon any question, howsoever arising, as to the limits inter se of the Constitutional powers of the Commonwealth and those of any State or States, or as to the limits inter se of the Constitutional powers of any two or more States, unless the High Court shall certify that the question is one which ought to be determined by Her Majesty in Council.

The High Court may so certify if satisfied that for any special reason the certificate should be granted, and thereupon an appeal shall lie to Her Majesty in Council on the question without further leave.

Except as provided in this section, this Constitution shall not impair any right which the Queen may be pleased to exercise by virtue of Her Royal prerogative to grant special leave of appeal from the High Court to Her Majesty in Council. The Parliament may make laws limiting the matters in which such leave may be asked, but proposed laws containing any such limitation shall be reserved by the Governor-General for Her Majesty's pleasure.

Because the High Court was equally divided in opinion, it granted a certificate pursuant to section 74 of the Constitution in the following form:

Pursuant to sec. 74 of the Constitution this Court doth certify that, so far as the question whether the Parliament of the Commonwealth has power to make laws for the compulsory examination of witnesses by Royal Commissions touching matters which are not within the ambit of the existing legislative powers of the Commonwealth, that is to say, such powers as may now be exercised without an amendment of the Constitution under the provisions of sec. 128, is a question as to the limits inter se of the constitutional powers of the Commonwealth and those of any State or States, the question is one which ought to be determined by His Majesty in Council.

== The decision of the Privy Council ==
The Privy Council did not answer the question posed by the High Court, whether a Royal Commission could inquire into matters that might be the subject of an amendment to the Constitution. Instead the Privy Council held that, contrary to the decision of all four of the judges of the High Court, the Royal Commission Act, was invalid so far as it purported to enable a Royal Commission to compel answers generally to questions, or to order the production of documents.

== Significance ==
In 1918 Prime Minister Hughes described the decision of the Privy Council as one "which must have caused great embarrassment and confusion, if it were not for the fortunate fact that the reasons for the Judicial Committee's decision are stated in such a way that no court and no counsel in Australia has yet been able to find out what they were".

The High Court never certified another inter se appeal. In Whitehouse v Queensland the court said: "experience shows - and that experience was anticipated when s. 74 was enacted - that it is only those who dwell under a Federal Constitution who can become adequately qualified to interpret and apply its provisions."

In the case of Kirmani v Captain Cook Cruises Pty Ltd (1985), the High Court went further holding that it would never again grant a certificate of appeal, stating "Although the jurisdiction to grant a certificate stands in the Constitution, such limited purpose as it had has long since been spent. The march of events and the legislative changes that have been effected - to say nothing of national sentiment - have made the jurisdiction obsolete."

This declaration by the Court and the provisions of the Australia Act 1986 by both the UK Parliament and the Parliament of Australia (with the request and consent of the Australian States) have for practical purposes ended all means of appeal from Australian courts to the Privy Council.

== See also ==
- High Court of Australia: Appeals to the Privy Council
- Kirmani v Captain Cook Cruises Pty Ltd (No 2)
