= Diplomatic protection =

Right under international law of a sovereign state to take action to protect its citizens

In international law, diplomatic protection (or diplomatic espousal) is a means for a state to take diplomatic and other action against another state on behalf of its national whose rights and interests have been injured by that state. Diplomatic protection, which has been confirmed in different cases of the Permanent Court of International Justice and the International Court of Justice, is a discretionary right of a state and may take any form that is not prohibited by international law. It can include consular action, negotiations with the other state, political and economic pressure, judicial or arbitral proceedings or other forms of peaceful dispute settlement.

== History ==
Diplomatic protection traces its roots to the eighteenth century. The idea that a state has a right to protect its subjects who are abroad has been expressed by Emmerich de Vattel in his Law of Nations:

Whoever ill-treats a citizen indirectly injures the State, which must protect that citizen.

The doctrine of diplomatic protection has attracted much criticism, particularly in former colonies. Specifically, in Latin America, the Calvo Doctrine was devised to avoid the invocation of diplomatic protection by Western nationals. Nevertheless, diplomatic protection has been recognized as customary international law by international courts and tribunals as well as scholars. After the Second World War, with the use of force being outlawed as an instrument of international relations, diplomatic protection usually takes other forms, such as judicial proceedings or economic pressure.

In 2006, the International Law Commission adopted draft Articles on Diplomatic Protection, for regulating the entitlement and the exercise of diplomatic protection, largely codifying established practice. These draft articles have not been submitted to a conference to formalize them into a treaty.

== The nature of diplomatic protection ==
Traditionally, diplomatic protection has been seen as a right of the state, not of the individual that has been wronged under international law. An injury to an alien is considered to be an indirect injury to his home country and in taking up his case the state is seen as asserting its own rights. In its famous Mavrommatis Judgment of 1924, the Permanent Court of International Justice summarized this concept as follows:

It is an elementary principle of international law that a State is entitled to protect its subjects, when injured by acts contrary to international law committed by another State, from whom they have been unable to obtain satisfaction through the ordinary channels. By taking up the case of one of its subjects and by resorting to diplomatic action or international judicial proceedings on his behalf, a State is in reality asserting its own rights - its right to ensure, in the person of its subjects, respect for the rules of international law.

Hence, under general international law, a state is in no way obliged to take up its national's case and resort to diplomatic protection if it considers this not to be in its own political or economic interests.

== Legal requirements ==
Customary international law recognises the existence of certain requirements that must be met before a state can validly espouse its national's interest. The two main requirements are exhaustion of local remedies and continuous nationality.

=== Exhaustion of local remedies ===
Diplomatic espousal of a national's claims will not be internationally acceptable unless the national in question has given the host state the chance to correct the wrong done to him through its own national remedies. Exhaustion of local remedies usually means that the individual must first pursue his claims against the host state through its national courts up to the highest level before he can ask the state of his nationality to take up those claims and that state can validly do so.

=== Effective and continuous nationality ===
The second important requirement is that the individual who has been wronged must maintain the nationality of the espousing state from the moment of injury until at least the presentation of the claim by way of diplomatic espousal. If the nationality of the individual in question changes in the meantime, the state of his former nationality will not be able validly to espouse his claims. The claim by a state on behalf of its national may also be dismissed or declared inadmissible if there is no effective and genuine link between the national concerned and the state that seeks to protect him (see the International Court of Justice judgment in the Nottebohm case).

== See also ==
- Barcelona Traction
- Diplomatic passport
- Master Nationality Rule
