= Convention on Certain Questions Relating to the Conflict of Nationality Laws =

1930 League of Nations convention

- Signed and ratified Ascended or succeeded Denounced Signed but not ratified
- Effective: July 1, 1937
- Languages: English, French

The Convention on Certain Questions Relating to the Conflict of Nationality Laws (French: Convention concernant certaines questions relatives aux conflits de lois sur la nationalité) was a League of Nations convention adopted during the League of Nations Codification Conference, 1930 in The Hague. It was signed by many states, but ratified by only twenty-three.

It was the first international attempt to ensure that all natural persons had a nationality, and to resolve some of the issues from conflict of possible nationalities. This was later refined by the 1961 Convention on the Reduction of Statelessness, the 1963 Convention on the Reduction of Cases of Multiple Nationality and on Military Obligations in Cases of Multiple Nationality and the 1997 European Convention on Nationality.

Aspects of the convention have become "modern state practice" internationally, beyond the states that ratified the convention. For example, Articles 3 to 6 relating to the provision of diplomatic protection and assistance when a person with multiple citizenship is abroad are generally followed, often named the Master Nationality Rule, despite the absence of a treaty.

== Ratification ==
Party	State	Date
Belgium	Ratified	4 April 1939
Brazil	Ratified	19 September 1931
United Kingdom	Ratified	6 April 1934
Canada	Ratified	6 April 1934
Australia	Ratified	10 November 1937
India	Ratified	7 October 1935
China	Ratified	14 February 1935
Monaco	Acceded	27 April 1931
Netherlands	Ratified	2 April 1937
Norway	Acceded	16 March 1931
Poland	Ratified	15 June 1934
Sweden	Ratified	6 July 1933
Austria	Signed	
Canada	Denounced	15 May 1996
Cyprus	Succeeded	27 March 1970
Eswatini	Acceded	18 September 1970
Fiji	Succeeded	15 May 1996
Kiribati	Succeeded	29 November 1983
Lesotho	Succeeded	
Liberia	Acceded	16 September 2005
Malta	Succeeded	16 August 1996
Mauritius	Succeeded	18 July 1969
Pakistan	Succeeded	29 July 1953
Zimbabwe	Succeeded	1 December 1998

== Article 1 ==
The first article states that it is up to every state to set its own nationality laws; however, that power is limited:

It is for each State to determine under its own law who are its nationals. This law shall be recognised by other States in so far as it is consistent with international conventions, international custom, and the principles of law generally recognised with regard to nationality.

However, the Convention recognised that individual national laws without regarding the broader international scope could lead to statelessness. Citing that acquisition and loss of nationality typically occurred by birth, minority, or marriage, the convention made proposals to counter the rise of statelessness.
