= Kirmani v Captain Cook Cruises Pty Ltd (No 2) =

Judgement of the High Court of Australia

- Court: High Court of Australia
- Decided: 17 April 1985
- Citations: [1985] HCA 27, (1985) 159 CLR 461

Case history
- Prior actions: Kirmani v Captain Cook Cruises Pty Ltd (No 1) [1985] HCA 8, (1985) 159 CLR 351

Court membership
- Judges sitting: Gibbs CJ, Mason, Wilson Brennan, Deane, Dawson JJ

Case opinions
- (per curiam) The circumstance that a question is of great importance and that opinions are divided upon it does not provide a reason for granting a certificate. Questions of constitutional importance should be finally decided by the High Court and the jurisdiction to grant a certificate under s 74 is obsolete.

Kirmani v Captain Cook Cruises Pty Ltd (No 2), was a decision of the High Court of Australia on 17 April 1985 concerning section 74 of the Constitution of Australia. The Court denied an application by the Attorney-General of Queensland seeking a certificate that would permit the Privy Council to hear an appeal from the High Court's decision in Kirmani v Captain Cook Cruises Pty Ltd (No 1).

== Background ==
Section 74 of the Constitution established the High Court as the final court of appeal for Australia, but included the compromise that the High Court could give leave for the Privy Council to hear appeals against High Court decisions, providing that:

No appeal shall be permitted to the Queen in Council from a decision of the High Court upon any question, howsoever arising, as to the limits inter se of the Constitutional powers of the Commonwealth and those of any State or States, or as to the limits inter se of the Constitutional powers of any two or more States, unless the High Court shall certify that the question is one which ought to be determined by Her Majesty in Council.

The High Court may so certify if satisfied that for any special reason the certificate should be granted, and thereupon an appeal shall lie to Her Majesty in Council on the question without further leave.

Except as provided in this section, this Constitution shall not impair any right which the Queen may be pleased to exercise by virtue of Her Royal prerogative to grant special leave of appeal from the High Court to Her Majesty in Council. The Parliament may make laws limiting the matters in which such leave may be asked, but proposed laws containing any such limitation shall be reserved by the Governor-General for Her Majesty's pleasure.

This power was exercised only once, when a certificate to appeal was granted in Colonial Sugar Refining Co Ltd v Attorney-General (Cth) In 1961 the High Court under Chief Justice Sir Owen Dixon said: "experience shows – and that experience was anticipated when s. 74 was enacted – that it is only those who dwell under a Federal Constitution who can become adequately qualified to interpret and apply its provisions."

The Commonwealth Parliament was empowered to legislate to limit the appeals to the Privy Council and it did so in 1968 and 1975.

== Decision ==
In Kirmani v Captain Cook Cruises Pty Ltd (No 1) the Court held by majority that s. 104(3) of the Navigation Amendment Act 1979 (Cth) validly repealed part of "the Imperial Act known as the Merchant Shipping Act, 1894 ... in so far as that Act ... is part of the law of the Commonwealth". The Attorney-General of Queensland, who unsuccessfully intervened in Kirmani v Captain Cook Cruises Pty Ltd (No. 1) sought a certificate, under section 74 of the Constitution, to permit an appeal to the Privy Council.

The High Court unanimously rejected the application, holding that it would never again grant a certificate of appeal, stating

"Although the jurisdiction to grant a certificate stands in the Constitution, such limited purpose as it had has long since been spent. The march of events and the legislative changes that have been effected – to say nothing of national sentiment – have made the jurisdiction obsolete."

== Significance ==
This declaration by the Court and the provisions of the Australia Act 1986 by both the UK Parliament and the Parliament of Australia (with the request and consent of the Australian States) have for practical purposes ended all means of appeal from Australian courts to the Privy Council.

== See also ==
- Australia Act 1986
- High Court of Australia: Appeals to the Privy Council
- List of High Court of Australia cases
