= Master Nationality Rule =

Consequence of League of Nations convention

Signatories of Convention on Certain Questions Relating to the Conflict of Nationality Laws: Signed and ratified Ascended or succeeded Denounced Signed but not ratified

The Master Nationality Rule is a consequence of Article 4 of the Convention on Certain Questions Relating to the Conflict of Nationality Laws of 1930, a treaty ratified by twenty-three parties. This provides that "a State may not afford diplomatic protection to one of its nationals against a state whose nationality such person also possesses". It is a codification of customary international law and is generally "modern state practice" internationally.

In terms of practical effect, it means that when a multiple citizen is in the country of one of their nationalities, that country has the right to treat that person as if they were solely a citizen or national of that country. This includes the right to impose military service obligations or require an exit visa to leave.

== Recent history ==
In 2006, the International Law Commission adopted draft Articles on Diplomatic Protection, largely codifying established practice, which in general reaffirmed the rule. However it sought to ease the strictness of traditional practice with a proposal that where the nationality of a protecting state is "predominant", diplomatic protection may be given. These draft Articles have not been submitted to a conference to formalize them into a treaty. The draft Article 7 states:

A State of nationality may not exercise diplomatic protection in respect of a person against a State of which that person is also a national unless the nationality of the former State is predominant, both at the date of injury and at the date of the official presentation of the claim.

Eileen Denza, Professor of International Law at University College London and a former Legal Adviser in the Foreign and Commonwealth Office, states that the rule is a codification of a "classic rule", and as of 2018, remains "modern state practice" internationally.

James Larry Taulbee and Gerhard von Glahn, in their 2022 U.S. legal textbook, write that regarding the underlying Articles 3 to 6 of the Convention on Certain Questions Relating to the Conflict of Nationality: "states today in practice follow almost all of those provisions, despite the absence of general conventional rules." They do not use the name "Master Nationality Rule", but explicitly give a summary of the rule.

=== Cold War exceptions ===
During the Cold War era, the United States signed consular agreements with certain Warsaw Pact countries providing that a U.S. citizen who entered that country with a U.S. passport and the appropriate visa would not be subsequently treated as a citizen of that country (and hence prevented from leaving). The Warsaw Pact countries involved (notably Poland) wished to encourage tourism from emigrants and their descendants settled in the U.S. Since the dissolution of the Warsaw Pact in 1991, many of those countries have abolished visa requirements for U.S. citizens thus nullifying those provisions (for detailed discussion see under Dual citizenship in Poland).

Australia, Canada, and the United States have concluded similar consular agreements with the People's Republic of China.

== Detailed explanation by the United Kingdom ==
The United Kingdom Home Office gave a detailed explanation of the rule in 2010:

Commonly known as the "Master Nationality Rule", the practical effect of this Article is that where a person is a national of, for example, two States (A and B), and is in the territory of State A, then State B has no right to claim that person as its national or to intervene on that person's behalf. Such a person who goes into the territory of a third state may be treated as a national of either A or B – it does not normally matter which one, except, for example, where the courts of the third state have to adjudicate upon matters relating to that person's status and the relevant laws depend on the person's nationality. In such cases, it is necessary to choose an effective nationality (i.e. one of the two nationalities is selected as effective for the purposes of the third state).

The United Kingdom Foreign Office restated this in its advice to dual citizens abroad, stating it "would not normally offer you support or get involved in dealings between you and the authorities of that state." The United Kingdom may still make informal diplomatic representations to the authorities of another country when a British citizen is held in another country, even if that person is also a citizen of that country, in case of special humanitarian needs, such as the intervention made by then UK foreign secretary Philip Hammond during the Causeway Bay Books disappearances in 2015.
