= Nationality law =

Law of a sovereign state

Nationality law is the law of a sovereign state, and of each of its jurisdictions, that defines the legal manner in which a national identity is acquired and how it may be lost. In international law, the legal means to acquire nationality and formal membership in a nation are separated from the relationship between a national and the nation, known as citizenship. Some nations domestically use the terms interchangeably, though by the 20th century, nationality had commonly come to mean the status of belonging to a particular nation with no regard to the type of governance which established a relationship between the nation and its people. In law, nationality describes the relationship of a national to the state under international law and citizenship describes the relationship of a citizen within the state under domestic statutes. Different regulatory agencies monitor legal compliance for nationality and citizenship. A person in a country of which he or she is not a national is generally regarded by that country as a foreigner or alien. When the sovereignty over a territory is transferred from one state to another, individuals may be given the right of option of nationality. A person who has no recognised nationality to any jurisdiction is regarded as stateless.

== Principles ==
Nationality laws can use several bases for acquisition. Three commonly discussed bases are:

1. jus soli, or right by birth on the soil;
2. jus sanguinis, or right of the blood; and
3. jus matrimonii, or right of marriage.

Laws may combine more than one route to nationality. Comparative data show that unconditional jus soli is concentrated in the Americas, while many other states provide only conditional forms of birthright citizenship.

=== Jus soli ===
Jus soli is the principle whereby birth within a country's territory can confer that country's nationality. In English common law, birth within the King's dominions generally entailed allegiance to the Crown; that doctrine influenced nationality rules in British colonies and the later American understanding of birthright citizenship.

Jus soli is often conditional rather than absolute. Cambodia, for example, grants Khmer nationality at birth to a child born in Cambodia to foreign parents when both parents were themselves born and legally resident in Cambodia. Comparative citizenship-law data likewise distinguish unconditional from conditional territorial birthright regimes.

Nationality rules may also contain ancestry or racial qualifications. Article 27(b) of the Constitution of Liberia states that only persons who are "Negroes or of Negro descent" qualify by birth or naturalization to be citizens of Liberia.

=== Jus sanguinis ===
Jus sanguinis is the principle of acquiring nationality through descent, most commonly from a parent. Italy historically permitted transmission across multiple generations, but legislation enacted in 2025 restricted automatic citizenship for people born abroad who hold another citizenship. The current rules include exceptions where a parent or grandparent held exclusively Italian citizenship, or where a parent or adoptive parent resided legally in Italy for at least two continuous years after acquiring Italian citizenship and before the child's birth or adoption.

=== Jus matrimonii ===
Some states allow nationality to be acquired on the basis of marriage. In Cape Verde, a foreigner married to a Cape Verdean national may acquire nationality by making the prescribed declaration during the marriage.

At the beginning of the 20th century, many legal systems treated a married woman's nationality as dependent on her husband's, so marriage to a foreign man could automatically confer the husband's nationality and cause loss of the woman's prior nationality. International reform efforts during the interwar period increasingly challenged this system.

Some modern nationality statutes expressly provide that marriage does not automatically change either spouse's nationality. Bulgaria's Citizenship Act, for example, states that concluding or dissolving a marriage between a Bulgarian citizen and a foreign citizen, or a change in one spouse's nationality during marriage, does not automatically change the other spouse's nationality. Other states facilitate naturalization for spouses; under Spain's Civil Code, a person married to a Spanish citizen may qualify after one year of legal residence, subject to the statutory conditions.

=== Jus officii ===
Uniquely, citizenship of the Vatican City is jus officii, namely on the grounds of appointment to work in a certain capacity in the service of the Holy See. It usually ceases upon cessation of the appointment. Citizenship may also be extended to the spouse and children of a citizen, provided they are authorized to reside and are living together in the city. Anyone who loses Vatican citizenship and does not possess other citizenship automatically becomes an Italian citizen as provided in the Lateran Treaty.

=== Naturalization ===
Naturalization is a common route by which a non-national may acquire nationality, generally subject to residence and other statutory conditions. In GLOBALCIT's comparison of laws in force in 2020, five years was the most frequent nominal residence requirement, and most countries with a residence-based route required no more than ten years.

== Limits to nationality law ==
By international custom, each sovereign state generally has the right to freely determine who it will recognise as its nationals and citizens. Such determinations may be made by custom, statutory law, case law (precedent), or a combination of either. In some cases, the determination may be governed by public international law—e.g., by treaties and the European Convention on Nationality.

Nevertheless, states' rights to determine who their nationals are is not absolute, and states must comply with their human rights obligations concerning the granting and loss of nationality. In particular, nationals must not be arbitrarily deprived of their nationality. The right to a nationality and the prohibition against arbitrary deprivation of nationality are codified in article 15 of the "Universal Declaration of Human Rights".

Article 1 of the "Convention on Certain Questions Relating to the Conflict of Nationality Laws" states:

It is for each State to determine under its own law who are its nationals. This law shall be recognised by other States in so far as it is consistent with international conventions, international custom, and the principles of law generally recognised with regard to nationality.

The "Inter-American Court of Human Rights" went further in limiting state's right to determine nationality:

[T]he manners in which States regulate matters bearing on nationality cannot today be deemed within their sole jurisdiction; [the powers enjoyed by the States in that area] are also circumscribed by their obligations to ensure the full protection of human rights.

== Ethnic group-related provisions, by country ==
Some nationality and immigration laws provide facilitated acquisition or residence for emigrants, descendants, or persons of specified national or ethnic origin. A non-exhaustive list follows.

=== Armenia ===
Article 14 of the Constitution of Armenia (1995) provides that "individuals of Armenian origin shall acquire nationality of the Republic of Armenia through a simplified procedure." This provision is consistent with the Declaration on Independence of Armenia, issued by the Supreme Soviet of Armenia in 1990, which declared, in article 4, that "Armenians living abroad are entitled to the citizenship of the Republic of Armenia."

=== Bulgaria ===
According to the Constitution of Bulgaria, Article 25(2): "A person of Bulgarian origin shall acquire Bulgarian nationality through a facilitated procedure."

Chapter Two of the Bulgarian Citizenship Act governs acquisition of Bulgarian citizenship. Article 9 recognizes citizenship by origin where descent from a Bulgarian citizen is established in the manner provided by law, while Article 15 provides facilitated naturalization for a person of Bulgarian origin.

=== China ===
Chinese law provides special protections and appropriate preferential treatment to returned Overseas Chinese, a term that refers to Chinese citizens who had settled abroad and returned to China for permanent residence. The "rights and interests of returned overseas Chinese" are afforded special protection according to Articles 50 and 89(12) of the Chinese Constitution.

==== Hong Kong ====
In April 2015, the Hong Kong Government announced a pilot scheme named "Admission Scheme for the Second Generation of Chinese Hong Kong Permanent Residents" (ASSG).

=== Taiwan ===
Taiwan's immigration rules distinguish Republic of China nationals without household registration in the Taiwan Area from nationals who have household registration. The National Immigration Agency maintains specific procedures governing the stay of nationals without household registration.

Since 1 January 2024, nationals without household registration who hold a valid biometric Republic of China passport and confirmed return or onward tickets may enter without first applying for an entry permit, subject to statutory exclusions; holders of valid non-biometric Republic of China passports must apply for a temporary entry permit on arrival.

=== Czech Republic ===
The Czech Republic grants nationality at birth to a child if at least one parent is a Czech national; Czech law permits dual or multiple nationality. Moreover, people of Czech origin might be granted the right to permanent residence (Czech origin is a reason worth of consideration).

In 1995, the Czech Republic amended its Nationality Law to provide the Interior Ministry with the discretion to waive the usual five-year residency requirement for foreigners that had been resettled in the Czech Republic by 31 December 1994. This amendment was aimed particularly at several hundred ethnic Czechs which had been brought by the Czech government from the Ukrainian region of Volhynia, and was of a limited duration. The amendment was consistent with what the Czech Ministry of Labor and Social Affairs has identified as "the Czech government's policy principles regarding the resettlement of foreigners of Czech origin living abroad." A private fund, the People In Need Czech Television Foundation, worked with government authorities between 1995 and 2001 to effect this resettlement in the specific instance of Russian and Kazakh nationals of Czech origin, and had resettled approximately 750 such persons as of 2000.

=== Finland ===
The Finnish Aliens Act provides residence-permit routes on remigration grounds for certain people with Finnish roots. The Finnish Immigration Service identifies eligible categories including former Finnish citizens and descendants who have at least one parent or grandparent who is or was a Finnish citizen by birth.

A separate remigration scheme for Ingrian Finns ended on 1 July 2016. Current rules retain specified routes for people who were evacuated from Ingria to Finland in 1943–1944 and later returned to the Soviet Union, or who served in the Finnish army in 1939–1945; applicants in these categories must also meet the listed conditions, including having accommodation in Finland.

=== Greece ===
The Greek Nationality Code contains specific routes for persons of Greek ethnic origin. Article 4 provides for acquisition by persons of Greek ethnic origin admitted to Greek military schools or enlisting as volunteers under specified conditions, while Article 10 provides a naturalization procedure for persons of Greek ethnic origin domiciled abroad through Greek consular authorities.

=== India ===
The former Person of Indian Origin (PIO) Card scheme applied to certain foreign nationals of Indian origin. The Government of India withdrew the PIO Card scheme with effect from 9 January 2015 and merged it into the Overseas Citizen of India framework.

The Citizenship (Amendment) Act 2003 and later amendments established the Overseas Citizen of India (OCI) framework. An OCI cardholder is a foreign national, not an Indian citizen. A person registered as an OCI cardholder for five years and ordinarily resident in India for the twelve months before applying may apply for Indian citizenship, subject to statutory conditions.

=== Ireland ===
Irish nationality law permits some people born abroad to acquire citizenship through an Irish-born grandparent by registration in the Foreign Births Register. A person born on the island of Ireland before 1 January 2005 is generally entitled to Irish citizenship; for births on or after that date, entitlement depends on the citizenship or residence history of a parent.

Section 16 of the Irish Nationality and Citizenship Act 1956, as amended, gives the responsible minister discretion to waive specified naturalization conditions for an applicant of Irish descent or with Irish associations.

=== Israel ===
The Law of Return, enacted by Israel in 1950 and amended in 1954 and 1970, gives Jews a statutory right to immigrate to Israel as olim and extends specified rights to a child and grandchild of a Jew and to their spouses. The extended family-member provisions do not apply to a person who has been a Jew and voluntarily changed religion. The law also permits refusal in specified cases involving activity directed against the Jewish people, danger to public health or state security, or a criminal past likely to endanger public welfare.

=== Japan ===
Under Japanese law, nationality is acquired at birth when the child's father or mother is a Japanese national, subject to the rules in the Nationality Act. Foreign nationals may acquire Japanese nationality through naturalization. The Ministry of Justice notes that some naturalization conditions are relaxed under Articles 6–8 for applicants with specified special relationships to Japan, including certain people born in Japan, spouses of Japanese nationals, children of Japanese nationals, and former Japanese nationals.

=== Norway ===
Norwegian citizenship rules contain special residence provisions for the Kola Norwegians, descendants of Norwegian citizens who emigrated to the Murmansk or Arkhangelsk areas of Russia from the 1850s until the border closed in the late 1920s. The Norwegian Directorate of Immigration states that qualifying applicants may be exempt from the permanent-residence-permit requirement and the ordinary residence-period requirement if their residence or work permit was granted because of that affiliation and they have completed two years of qualifying residence in Norway.

=== Philippines ===
Republic Act No. 9225, approved 29 August 2003, provides that natural-born citizens of the Philippines who lost Philippine citizenship by reason of naturalization as citizens of a foreign country are deemed to have reacquired Philippine citizenship upon taking an oath of allegiance; natural-born Philippine citizens who acquire foreign citizenship after the Act's effectivity retain Philippine citizenship upon taking the same oath. The unmarried children, whether legitimate, illegitimate or adopted, below 18 years of age, of those who reacquire Philippine citizenship under the Act are deemed citizens of the Philippines.

=== Russia ===
Russia provides simplified routes to citizenship for several categories of foreign citizens and stateless persons. Article 16 of the current citizenship law includes, among other categories, certain people with direct-line ancestors who were born or permanently resident in the Russian Soviet Federative Socialist Republic, or in territory of the Russian Empire or Soviet Union that lies within the present borders of the Russian Federation.

=== Spain ===
Spanish nationality may be acquired through several routes in the Civil Code, including nationality de origen (by origin), por opción (by option), por carta de naturaleza (by discretionary grant), por residencia (by residence), and por posesión de estado (by possession of status).

Nationality de origen includes, among other cases, a person born to a Spanish father or mother. Article 20 provides an option route for specified categories with close family ties to Spain and sets age-related rules for some forms of option.

For naturalization by residence, Article 22 sets a general period of ten years, reduced to two years for nationals by origin of Ibero-American countries, Andorra, the Philippines, Equatorial Guinea or Portugal, and for Sephardim. A one-year period applies in several specified cases, including a person born outside Spain to a father or mother, grandfather or grandmother who was originally Spanish, and a person who has been married to a Spanish citizen for one year and is not legally or de facto separated.

Article 26 provides that the legal-residence requirement for recovery of Spanish nationality does not apply to emigrants or their children. The Democratic Memory Law created additional temporary routes for specified descendants and other categories; the deadline for requesting an appointment to submit a new application under those provisions was 22 October 2025.

A separate procedure under Law 12/2015 created an exceptional route to Spanish nationality for Sephardim of Spanish origin without the ordinary residence requirement; that procedure was time-limited. The preamble to that law recounts earlier Spanish protection of Sephardic communities, including the 1924 decree that opened a temporary naturalization process for certain former Spanish protégés, their descendants, and members of families of Spanish origin; the period ended in 1930. It also describes later consular protection of some Sephardim during the Second World War, including the work of Ángel Sanz Briz.

In October 2006, the Andalusian Parliament asked the three parliamentary groups that form the majority to support an amendment that would ease the way for Morisco descendants to gain Spanish nationality. The proposal was originally made by IULV-CA, the Andalusian branch of the United Left. Such a measure might have benefited an indeterminate number of people, particularly in Morocco. However, the call went unheeded by the central Spanish authorities.

=== Ukraine ===
Article 3 of Ukraine's citizenship law treats as Ukrainian citizens all citizens of the former Soviet Union who were permanently resident in Ukraine when independence was proclaimed on 24 August 1991, as well as people who were living in Ukraine when the first citizenship law entered into force on 13 November 1991 and who were not citizens of another state.

=== United Kingdom ===
The British Nationality Act 1948 introduced citizenship of the United Kingdom and Colonies (CUKC) while retaining "British subject" (also called Commonwealth citizen) as a common status for citizens of the United Kingdom and Colonies and independent Commonwealth countries; at the time, British subjects were generally free to enter the United Kingdom. The Commonwealth Immigrants Act 1968, amending legislation passed in 1962, removed the right of entry from 200,000 south Asians long resident in British East Africa who had become the victims of the Africanization drive in newly independent Kenya and wished to move to Britain. The act required "substantial connection" to Britain, defined as:

1. birth or the birth of a parent or grandparent in the United Kingdom;
2. a parent or grandparent who was Naturalised in the United Kingdom;
3. a parent or grandparent who became a national of the United Kingdom or its colonies by adoption;
4. had acquired British Nationality under legislation passed in 1948 or 1964.

Further provisions extended rights to stepchildren. The wording of this legislation refers to 'Citizenship', 'Naturalisation' and 'Residence', and at no point refers to any specific ethnicity or ethnic group. Announcing his support for right of return legislation in Britain, Member of Parliament Quintin Hogg stated that, "All the great nations of the earth have what the Jews call a Diaspora," and affirmed that nations "special and residual obligation(s) toward them," which include recognizing their right to nationality.

The Immigration Act 1971 affirmed the principles of the 1968 legislation by creating a right of abode for specified people with close connections to the United Kingdom, including citizens of the United Kingdom and Colonies with qualifying connections through birth, adoption, registration or naturalisation.

The British Nationality Act 1981 created British citizenship, British Overseas Citizenship, and British Dependent Territories Citizenship. From 1 January 1983, British citizenship was acquired by citizens of the United Kingdom and Colonies who had the right of abode in the United Kingdom; the right of abode was also preserved for a limited group of Commonwealth citizens who had already held it under the 1971 Act.

=== United States ===
The Immigration and Nationality Act of 1952, as amended—including substantially by the 1965 amendments—forms the core of United States nationality and immigration law. This is codified in Chapter 12 of Title 8 of the U.S. Code, in which section 101(a)(22) states that the term "national of the United States" means:

1. "a citizen of the United States;" or
2. "a person who, though not a citizen of the United States, owes permanent allegiance to the United States."

The explanatory comments of this section, when originally written in 1940, provided clarification that all citizens were nationals of the United States but not all nationals were citizens.

=== Other countries ===
- Belarus: Official citizenship guidance states that the ordinary permanent-residence period may be reduced or waived for Belarusians, persons identifying as Belarusians, and their direct-line descendants born outside the present territory of Belarus, subject to the applicable legal conditions.
- Croatia: Croatian citizenship law provides a facilitated route for qualifying emigrants from the territory of present-day Croatia before 8 October 1991, as well as their spouses and descendants. Official guidance notes that applicants in this category are exempt from the Croatian-language and culture test otherwise required in some naturalization cases.
- Estonia: Article 36 (3) of the Constitution of Estonia states that "Every Estonian is entitled to settle in Estonia."
- Ghana: Ghana's right of abode law allows for people of African descent to settle in the country.
- Hungary: In 2010, Hungary passed a law granting nationality and the right of return to descendants of Hungarians living mostly on the former territory of the Hungarian Kingdom and now residing in Hungary's neighbouring countries. Slovakia, which at the time was reported as having about 500,000 ethnic Magyar citizens (roughly 10% of its population), objected vociferously.
- Iraq: see Iraqi nationality law.
- Kazakhstan: see Oralman.
- Lithuania: From the Constitution of Lithuania, Article 32(4): "Every Lithuanian person may settle in Lithuania."
- Poland: From the Constitution of Poland, Article 52(5): "Anyone whose Polish origin has been confirmed in accordance with statute may settle permanently in Poland." (see Polish nationality law.)
- Portugal: On April 12, 2013, the Portuguese parliament approved unanimously an amendment to its nationality laws which would permit the descendants of Jews expelled from Portugal in the 16th century to become Portuguese citizens.
- Romania: Romanian law allows former nationals and their descendants through the second degree to apply to reacquire Romanian nationality, subject to statutory conditions; for certain former nationals who lost citizenship for reasons not attributable to them, descendants through the third degree may qualify.
- South Korea: A former South Korean national who returns to South Korea for permanent residence after reaching age 65 and is granted restoration of nationality may retain a foreign nationality by making the statutory pledge not to exercise that foreign nationality in South Korea.
- Serbia: The Citizenship Law allows an emigrant or descendant of an emigrant to be admitted to citizenship under Article 18 if the statutory conditions are met, including a written declaration that the applicant considers Serbia their state. Article 23 provides a route for a member of the Serbian people who does not reside in Serbia, again subject to the statutory declaration and other conditions.

== See also ==
- Immigration law
- Citizenship
- Citizenship Act (disambiguation)
- Denaturalization
- Dual nationality
- Foreign born
- History of citizenship
- Human migration
- Passport
- Political asylum
