= League of Nations Codification Conference, 1930 =

International treaty-making conference

The League of Nations Codification Conference was held in The Hague from 13 March to 12 April 1930, for the purpose of formulating accepted rules in international law to subjects that until then were not addressed thoroughly. The conference's main achievement was the conclusion of the first international convention on the conflict of nationality laws.

== Background ==
On 22 September 1924 the Assembly of the League of Nations passed a resolution providing for the establishment of a 17-member committee for formulating a comprehensive system of international law on all outstanding issues. The committee's work led to the convening of the conference in 1930.

== Work done by the conference ==
The conference dealt eventually with three main issues on its agenda:

- Nationality laws of various states.
- Territorial waters.
- Responsibility of states for damage done in their territory to the person or property of foreigners.

Due to disagreements on most issues on the agenda, only the Convention on Certain Questions Relating to the Conflict of Nationality Laws could be agreed upon by the states that took part in the conference.

== Legacy of the codification conference ==
The legal interest of bringing about the codification of international law continued after the 1930 conference. The failure of that conference motivated the founders of the United Nations Organization to strive for a permanent commission to that end, which led to the establishment of the International Law Commission.

The failure of the 1930 conference served to remind the members of the new commission to proceed cautiously with the codification of international law through a longer and more gradual process.
