= Naturalization =

Citizenship acquisition by non-nationals

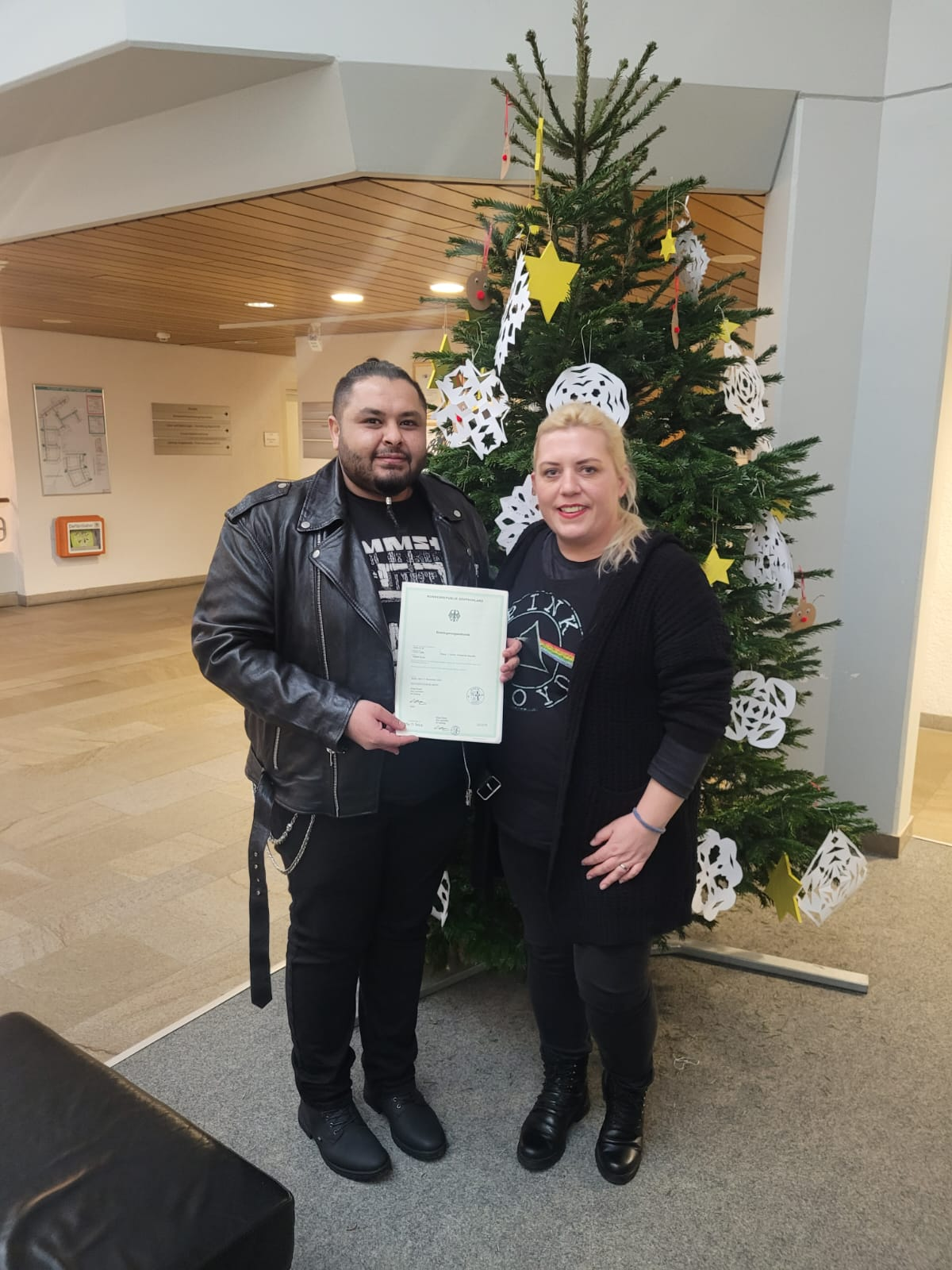
Naturalized Syrian refugee at the district administration building in Soest, Germany (2022)

Residence requirements in years for naturalization by country: 2 years 2.5 years 3 years 4 years 5 years 7 years / 8 years 9 years 10 years 12 years 14 years 15 years / 20 years 25 years 30 years 35 years No naturalization allowed Not stated by law or varies No data

Multiple nationality allowed without restriction Multiple nationality restricted to specific cases

Countries by birthright citizenship: Unconditional birthright citizenship for persons born in the country Birthright citizenship with restrictions Birthright citizenship abolished No birthright citizenship

Naturalization (or naturalisation) is the legal act or process by which a non-national of a country acquires the nationality of that country after birth. The definition of naturalization by the International Organization for Migration of the United Nations excludes citizenship that is automatically acquired (e.g. at birth) or is acquired by declaration. Naturalization usually involves an application or a motion and approval by legal authorities. The rules of naturalization vary from country to country but typically include a promise to obey and uphold that country's laws and taking and subscribing to an oath of allegiance, and may specify other requirements such as a minimum legal residency and adequate knowledge of the national dominant language or culture. To counter multiple citizenship, some countries require that applicants for naturalization renounce any other citizenship that they currently hold, but whether this renunciation actually causes loss of original citizenship, as seen by the host country and by the original country, will depend on the laws of the countries involved.

== History ==
The sharp increase in the numbers of refugees following World War I created many stateless persons, people who were not citizens of any state. This included the massive influx of stateless people which followed mass denaturalization and the expulsion of ethnic minorities from newly created nation states in the first part of the 20th century. In some cases, laws for mass naturalization were passed, as naturalization laws had been designed to cater for the relatively few people who had voluntarily moved from one country to another.

== Arguments ==
The increase in international migration following the end of World War II created a new category of migrants, most of them economic. For economic, political, humanitarian and pragmatic reasons, many states passed laws allowing a person to acquire their citizenship after birth, such as by marriage to a national – jus matrimonii – or by having ancestors who are nationals of that country, in order to reduce the scope of this category. Some countries allow naturalization due to military service.

Naturalization is politicized due to the reshaping of the electorate of the country. Some political parties support naturalization to increase the number of voters voting for their party. Mass passportization has been criticized for violating human rights.

== Countries without a path to naturalization ==
Myanmar and Uruguay are currently the only countries in the world that deny immigrants any path to naturalization. Uruguayan legal citizenship has special characteristics. A person who acquires it retains their nationality of origin, which is determined by Uruguayan law to be that of their country of birth and is therefore immutable. Legal citizens acquire political rights but do not acquire Uruguayan nationality as natural citizens do. According to Uruguayan law, those born in Uruguay or whose parents or grandparents are Uruguayan natural citizens are considered to be Uruguayan nationals.

As a result of Uruguay's unusual distinction between citizenship and nationality (it is the only country in the world that recognizes the right to citizenship without being a national), legal citizens have encountered problems with their Uruguayan passports at airports around the world since 2015. This is due to recommendations in the seventh edition of Doc. 9303 of the International Civil Aviation Organization (ICAO), which requires that travel documents issued by participating states include the "Nationality" field. The lack of a naturalization path means that the Nationality field in legal citizens' passports indicates their country of birth, which Uruguay assumes to be their nationality of origin. Many countries do not accept passports issued by a country that declares the holder to be a national of another country. As a consequence, it has severely curtailed legal citizens' exercise of the right to free movement, as their travel abroad is often difficult or downright impossible.

== Mass naturalizations ==
A few rare mass naturalization processes have been implemented by nation states. In 1891, Brazil granted naturalization to all aliens living in the country. In accordance with the 1923 population exchange agreement between Greece and Turkey following the Armistice of Mudanya and end of World War I in Anatolia, Greece rapidly naturalized all Greek, Roman or Orthodox Christian people fled from Turkey after the defeat of Greek Army in Turkey. Reciprocally, the Republic of Turkey naturalized all Turk or Muslim refugees and deportees (Bosniaks, Pomaks, Macedons, Muslim Greeks) from the Balkans (after Balkan Wars), Greece and other former regions of the Ottoman Empire during the redemption period. Another massive naturalization process was in favor of Armenian people coming from Anatolia, who went to Syria, Lebanon or other territories of the former Ottoman Empire. In the 1980s and 1990s, Turks and Muslims living in Bulgaria were forced to leave in a massive campaign. The Republic of Turkey accepted almost all refugees and deportees from Bulgaria and naturalized them. A significant refugee from that era was the athlete Naim Süleymanoğlu.

Canada instituted a mass naturalization by Act of Parliament with the enactment of the Canadian Citizenship Act 1946.

After annexation of the territories east of the Curzon line by the Soviet Union in 1945, Soviets naturalized en masse all the inhabitants of those territories—including ethnic Poles, as well as its other citizens who had been deported into the Soviet Union, mainly to Kazakhstan. Later on, Germany granted to the ethnic German population in Russia and Kazakhstan full citizenship rights. Poland has a limited repatriation program in place.

In the late 1970s, President Ferdinand Marcos facilitated the mass naturalization of ethnic Chinese in the Philippines.

The most recent massive naturalization case resulted from the Argentine economic crisis in the beginning of the 21st century. Existing or slightly updated right of return laws in Spain and Italy allowed many of their diasporic descendants to obtain—in many cases to regain—naturalization in virtue of jus sanguinis, as in the Greek case. Hence, many Argentines acquired European nationality.

Since the Fourteenth Amendment to the United States Constitution grants citizenship only to those "born or naturalized in the United States, and subject to the jurisdiction thereof", and the original United States Constitution only grants Congress the power of naturalization, it could be argued that all acts of Congress that expand the right of citizenship are cases of mass naturalization. This includes the acts that extended U.S. citizenship to citizens of Puerto Rico, the United States Virgin Islands, Guam, and the Northern Mariana Islands, as well as the Indian Citizenship Act of 1924 which made all Native Americans citizens (most of them were previously excluded under the "jurisdiction" clause of the 14th Amendment).

In the eastern Malaysian state of Sabah, mass naturalization also occurred during the administration of United Sabah National Organisation (USNO) and Sabah People's United Front (BERJAYA's) Muslim-dominated political parties to increase the Muslim population in the territory by naturalising immigrants and refugees from the mainly-Muslim dominated areas of Mindanao and Sulu Archipelago of the Philippines and Sulawesi of Indonesia.

== Illegal naturalization ==
Naturalization can be declared illegal resulting in denaturalization.

The mass naturalization of people in occupied territories is illegal under the laws of war (Hague and Geneva Conventions). However, there have been many instances of such illegal mass naturalizations in the 20th century.

== Summary by country ==
The following list is a brief summary of the duration of legal residence before a national of a foreign state, without any cultural, historical, or marriage ties or connections to the state in question, can request citizenship under that state's naturalization laws.

| Country | Residence requirement | Residence requirement notes | Other notes | Multiple citizenship | Main article | Ref. |
|---|---|---|---|---|---|---|
| Afghanistan | 5 years | | | No | Afghan nationality law | |
| Albania | 5 years | Continuous residence. | | Yes | Albanian nationality law | |
| Algeria | 7 years | | | Yes | Algerian nationality law | |
| Andorra | 20 years | Continuous permanent residence. Reduced to 10 years if all mandatory education completed in Andorra. | | No | Andorran nationality law | |
| Angola | 10 years | Continuous residence. | | Partial | Angolan nationality law | |
| Antigua and Barbuda | 7 years | Continuous residence. Reduced to 3 years if married to a citizen. | | Yes | Antiguan and Barbudan nationality law | |
| Argentina | 2 years | Continuous residence. Must not exit from the country, and the applicant also must have minimal founds. Naturalization by investment allowed. | Other options, such as "Nationality per option" available | Yes | Argentine nationality law | |
| Armenia | 3 years | | | Yes | Armenian nationality law | |
| Australia | 4 years | Lawful residence for 4 years including 12 months as permanent resident. | | Yes | Australian nationality law | |
| Austria | 10 years | Reduced to 6 years for people born in Austria, EU/EEA citizens, or those deemed "exceptionally integrated". Multiple nationalities allowed only by birth or with special permission. 10 years for refugees | | Partial | Austrian nationality law | |
| Azerbaijan | 5 years | | | No | Azerbaijani nationality law | |
| Bahamas | 10 years | | | No | Bahamian nationality law | |
| Bahrain | 10 years | | | No | Bahraini nationality law | |
| Bangladesh | 5 years | | | Partial | Bangladeshi nationality law | |
| Barbados | 5 years | | | Yes | Barbadian nationality law | |
| Belarus | 7 years | | | Yes | Belarusian nationality law | |
| Belgium | 5 years | Continuous residence. | | Yes | Belgian nationality law | |
| Belize | 5 years | | | Yes | Belizean nationality law | |
| Benin | 10 years | | | Yes | Beninese nationality law | |
| Bhutan | 20 years | Reduced to 15 years for those with citizen parent. | | No | Bhutanese nationality law | |
| Bolivia | 3 years | Uninterrupted residence. | | Yes | Bolivian nationality law | |
| Bosnia and Herzegovina | 8 years | Continuous residence. | | Partial | Bosnian nationality law | |
| Botswana | 10 years | | | No | Botswanan nationality law | |
| Brazil | 4 years | Uninterrupted permanent residence. Reduced to 1 year of residence for individuals with a Brazilian spouse or child, as well as for citizens of Portuguese language countries. | | Yes | Brazilian nationality law | |
| (United Kingdom) British Overseas Territories | 5 years | Unrestricted immigration status required. Physical presence required, with no more than 450 days' absence in the last 5 years and 90 days in the last year. Reduced to 3 years if married to a citizen. | | Yes | British Overseas Territories citizenship | |
| Brunei | 10 years | | | No | Bruneian nationality law | |
| Bulgaria | 5 years | Reduced to 3 years if born in Bulgaria, married to a citizen, or settled in the country before age 18. | EU/EEA/Swiss citizens and spouses of Bulgarians can keep existing citizenship. | Partial | Bulgarian nationality law | |
| Burkina Faso | 10 years | | | Yes | Burkinabé nationality law | |
| Burundi | 10 years | Reduced to 5 years if married to a citizen. | | Yes | Burundian nationality law | |
| Cambodia | 7 years | | | Yes | Cambodian nationality law | |
| Cameroon | 5 years | | | No | Cameroonian nationality law | |
| Canada | 3 years | Three years' permanent residence required. Physical presence required for at least 1,095 days in the 5 years prior to application, with any time spent as a temporary resident counted as half, up to a maximum of 365 days. | | Yes | Canadian nationality law | |
| Cape Verde | 5 years | | | Yes | Cape Verdean nationality law | |
| Central African Republic | 35 years | | Must have agriculture/property investments and have received a national honour. | No | Nationality law of the Central African Republic | |
| Chad | 15 years | | | No | Chadian nationality law | |
| Chile | 5 years | Continuous residence. | | Yes | Chilean nationality law | |
| China | N/A | Permanent residence required. No specific residency period specified in law in mainland China. 7 years minimum residence required in Hong Kong and Macau. | Must have parent or relative from China. | No | Chinese nationality law | |
| Colombia | 7 years | Requires 5 years of permanent residence, which is usually acquired after having a migrant visa for 2–5 years, depending on the type of visa. | Permanent residence required time is reduced to 2 years for those with Colombian children, married with a Colombian, or with Spanish citizenship | Yes | Colombian nationality law | |
| Comoros | 10 years | | | Yes | Comorian nationality law | |
| Congo | 10 years | | | Yes | Republic of the Congo nationality law | |
| Costa Rica | 7 years | | | Yes | Costa Rican nationality law | |
| Croatia | 8 years | Continuous residence. | | Partial | Croatian nationality law | |
| Cuba | 5 years | | | Partial | Cuban nationality law | |
| Cyprus | 7 years | Reduced time period via citizenship by investment programme. | | Yes | Cypriot nationality law | |
| Czechia | 10 years | Reduced to 3 years for EU citizens. | | Yes | Czech nationality law | |
| Democratic Republic of the Congo | 5 years | | | No | Democratic Republic of the Congo nationality law | |
| Denmark | 8 years | Continuous residence. | | Yes | Danish nationality law | |
| Djibouti | 10 years | | | Yes | Djiboutian nationality law | |
| Dominica | 7 years | | | Yes | Dominican nationality law | |
| Dominican Republic | 7 years | | | Yes | Dominican Republic nationality law | |
| East Timor | 10 years | | | Partial | East Timorese nationality law | |
| Ecuador | 5 years | Temporary residence for 2 years followed by permanent residence for 3 years. Reduced for those with Ecuadorian family members. Absences must be less than 90 days per year. | | Yes | Ecuadorian nationality law | |
| Egypt | 10 years | | | Yes | Egyptian nationality law | |
| El Salvador | 5 years | | | Yes | Salvadoran nationality law | |
| Equatorial Guinea | 10 years | | | No | Nationality law of Equatorial Guinea | |
| Eritrea | 20 years | | | Partial | Eritrean nationality law | |
| Estonia | 8 years | Temporary residence for 3 years, followed by permanent residence for 5 years. | Multiple citizenship tolerated for birthright citizens but not naturalised citizens. | Partial | Estonian nationality law | |
| Eswatini | 5 years | | | No | Emaswati nationality law | |
| Ethiopia | 4 years | | | No | Ethiopian nationality law | |
| Fiji | 5 years | Lawful residence for 5 years out of the previous 10 years. | | Yes | Fijian nationality law | |
| Finland | 8 years | Continuous residence. Reduced to 5 years in some cases (required language skills, spouse of a Finnish citizen, stateless), or 2 years as a citizen of another Nordic country. | | Yes | Finnish nationality law | |
| France | 5 years | Continuous residence. Reduced to 2 years for applicants with a master's degree in France. Reduced to 0 years for applicants with French as their mother tongue who can justify a minimum of 5 years of schooling in French in a country where one of its official languages is French. | | Yes | French nationality law | |
| Gabon | 10 years | | | No | Gabonese nationality law | |
| Gambia | 10 years | | Dual citizenship allowed if married to a citizen. | Yes | Gambian nationality law | |
| Georgia | 10 years | Consecutive lawful residence. | | No | Georgian nationality law | |
| Germany | 5 years | | | Yes | German nationality law | |
| Ghana | 5 years | | | Yes | Ghanaian nationality law | |
| Greece | 7 years | Reduced to 3 years for EU citizens. | | Yes | Greek nationality law | |
| Grenada | 7 years | | | Yes | Grenadian nationality law | |
| Guatemala | 10 years | | | Partial | Guatemalan nationality law | |
| Guinea | 5 years | | | Yes | Guinean nationality law | |
| Guinea-Bissau | 5 years | | | Yes | Nationality law of Guinea-Bissau | |
| Guyana | 7 years | | | Yes | Guyanese nationality law | |
| Haiti | 5 years | | | Yes | Haitian nationality law | |
| Honduras | 3 years | | | Partial | Honduran nationality law | |
| Hungary | 8 years | Continuous residence. | | Yes | Hungarian nationality law | |
| Iceland | 7 years | | | Yes | Icelandic nationality law | |
| India | 12 years | Continuous residence during 12 months immediately before the application. Resident for 11 out of the 14 years before the 12-month period. | | No | Indian nationality law | |
| Indonesia | 5 years | | | No | Indonesian nationality law | |
| Iran | 5 years | Legal residence. | | Partial | Iranian nationality law | |
| Iraq | 10 years | | | Yes | Iraqi nationality law | |
| Ireland | 5 years | "Reckonable" residence for 5 of the preceding 9 years. Reduced to 3 years if married to a citizen. Continuous residence for 12 months prior to application. | | Yes | Irish nationality law | |
| Israel | 3 years | Resident for 3 years in the previous 5 years. Must have permanent residence right. Jews may obtain citizenship upon arrival by the Law of Return. | | Partial | Israeli citizenship law | |
| Italy | 10 years | Continuous residence. Reduced to 2 years if married to a citizen, 3 years with citizen grandparent, 4 years for EU nationals, or 5 years for refugees or stateless people. | | Yes | Italian nationality law | |
| Ivory Coast | 5 years | | | Partial | Ivorian nationality law | |
| Jamaica | 5 years | | | Yes | Jamaican nationality law | |
| Japan | 5 years (recommended 10 years through operational policy) | Continuous residence. Reduced to 3 years if married to a citizen. | | No | Japanese nationality law | |
| Jordan | 15 years | | | Partial | Jordanian nationality law | |
| Kazakhstan | 5 years | | | No | Kazakhstani nationality law | |
| Kenya | 7 years | | | Yes | Kenyan nationality law | |
| Kiribati | 7 years | | | Partial | I-Kiribati nationality law | <r |
| Kuwait | 15 years | Applicable to foreign women marrying Kuwaiti citizen, but not foreign men. | | No | Kuwaiti nationality law | |
| Kyrgyzstan | 5 years | Continuous residence. | | Partial | Kyrgyz nationality law | |
| Laos | 10 years | 10 years of Permanent residency | | No | Lao nationality law | |
| Latvia | 10 years | | | Partial | Latvian nationality law | |
| Lebanon | 5 years | | | Yes | Lebanese nationality law | |
| Lesotho | 5 years | | | No | Basotho nationality law | |
| Liberia | 2 years | | Must be Black African or Black African descent | Yes | Liberian nationality law | |
| Libya | 10 years | | | Partial | Libyan nationality law | |
| Liechtenstein | 10 years | Years of residence under the age 20 count double. | | No | Liechtenstein nationality law | |
| Lithuania | 10 years | Continuous residence as a permanent resident. Reduced to 7 years if married to a citizen. | | No | Lithuanian nationality law | |
| Luxembourg | 5 years | Reduced to 3 years if married to a citizen. Continuous residence for 12 months prior to application. | | Yes | Luxembourgish nationality law | |
| Madagascar | 5 years | | | No | Malagasy nationality law | |
| Malawi | 7 years | Reduced to 5 years if of African race or with Commonwealth or Malawian ties. | | Yes | Malawian nationality law | |
| Malaysia | 12 years | | | No | Malaysian nationality law | |
| Maldives | 12 years | Continuous residence. Must be Muslim. | | Yes | Maldivian nationality law | |
| Mali | 5 years | | | Yes | Malian nationality law | |
| Malta | 5 years | Reduced requirement via citizenship by investment programme. | | Yes | Maltese nationality law | |
| Marshall Islands | 7 years | | | No | Marshallese nationality law | |
| Mauritania | 5 years | | | No | Mauritanian nationality law | |
| Mauritius | 5 years | | | Partial | Mauritian nationality law | |
| Mexico | 5 years | Reduced to two years for spouses of Mexican citizens. Mexican citizens by naturalization are generally not allowed to have multiple citizenship. | | Partial | Mexican nationality law | |
| Micronesia | 5 years | | Must be the child or spouse of a citizen of Micronesia. | No | Micronesian nationality law | |
| Moldova | 10 years | Reduced to 8 years for stateless persons or refugees. | | Yes | Moldovan nationality law | |
| Monaco | 10 years | Continuous residence. | | No | Monégasque nationality law | |
| Mongolia | 5 years | | | No | Mongolian nationality law | |
| Montenegro | 10 years | | | Partial | Montenegrin nationality law | |
| Morocco | 5 years | Continuous residence. | | Yes | Moroccan nationality law | |
| Mozambique | 5 years | | | Yes | Mozambican nationality law | |
| Myanmar | Impossible | | | No | Myanmar nationality law | |
| Namibia | 5 years | | | Partial | Namibian nationality law | |
| Nauru | 7 years | | Must be the child, spouse or descendant of a Nauruan national. | Yes | Nauruan nationality law | |
| Nepal | 15 years | | | No | Nepali nationality law | |
| Netherlands | 5 years | Continuous residence for 5 years, or continuous residence for 2 years with 10 years total residence, with a "non-temporary" residence permit required for naturalization. Reduced to three years for the spouse or partner of a Dutch citizen. | Multiple citizenship allowed in limited cases, generally with special permission required. | Partial | Dutch nationality law | (Note: The Netherlands requires that most naturalized citizens renounce other citizenships (unless they fall under an exemption category), and will revoke Dutch citizenship on failure to accomplish this.) |
| New Zealand | 5 years | Permanent residency required, normally after two years' residence with a temporary visa. Australian citizens/ Permanent Residents are eligible for immediate permanent residence under the Trans-Tasman Travel Agreement. Must be present for 1,350 days during the five years and 240 days in each of the five years. | | Yes | New Zealand nationality law | |
| Nicaragua | 4 years | | | Partial | Nicaraguan nationality law | |
| Niger | 10 years | | | Yes | Nigerien nationality law | |
| Nigeria | 15 years | Continuous residence. | | Yes | Nigerian nationality law | |
| North Korea | N/A | | | No | North Korean nationality law | |
| North Macedonia | 8 years | Continuous residence. | | Yes | Nationality law of North Macedonia | |
| Norway | 8 years | Resident in Norway for 8 years out of the previous 11 years. Absences of up to 2 months per year allowed. | | Yes | Norwegian nationality law | |
| Oman | 20 years | | | No | Omani nationality law | |
| Pakistan | 5 years | | | Partial | Pakistani nationality law | |
| Palau | N/A | | | Yes | Palauan nationality law | |
| Panama | 5 years | Continuous residence. | | No | Panamanian nationality law | |
| Papua New Guinea | 8 years | | | Partial | Nationality law of Papua New Guinea | |
| Paraguay | 5 years | | | Partial | Paraguayan nationality law | |
| Peru | 5 years | Continuous residence. | | Yes | Peruvian nationality law | |
| Philippines | 10 years | Continuous residence. The residency requirement is reduced to five years if an applicant is employed by the Government of the Philippines, has made significant economic or scientific contributions to the state, married to a Filipina woman, has taught in a Philippine school for at least two years, or was born in the country. | | Partial | Philippine nationality law | |
| Poland | 10 years | Resident for 10 years or permanent resident for 3 years. Permanent residence requirement reduced to one year in some cases. | | Yes | Polish nationality law | |
| Portugal | 10 years | Continuous residence. Reduced to three years for spouses of Portuguese citizens. Reduced time period via citizenship by "Golden Visa" investment programme. | | Yes | Portuguese nationality law | |
| Qatar | 25 years | | | No | Qatari nationality law | |
| Romania | 8 years | Reduced to 5 years for EU citizens. | | Yes | Romanian nationality law | |
| Russia | 5 years | Continuous residence. Reduced to 3 years if married to a citizen or 1 year for valued specialists and refugees. | | Yes | Russian nationality law | |
| Rwanda | 10 years | | | Yes | Rwandan nationality law | |
| Samoa | 5 years | | | Yes | Samoan nationality law | |
| San Marino | 20 years | Reduced to 10 years if married to a citizen. | | No | San Marino nationality law | |
| São Tomé and Príncipe | 5 years | | | No | São Toméan nationality law | |
| Saudi Arabia | 10 years | | | No | Saudi Arabian nationality law | |
| Senegal | 5 years | | | Yes | Senegalese nationality law | |
| Serbia | 6 years | | | Partial | Serbian nationality law | |
| Seychelles | 10 years | | Dual citizenship only for native born citizens who obtain another citizenship for work or through marriage. | Partial | Seychellois nationality law | |
| Sierra Leone | 5 years | | | Yes | Sierra Leonean nationality law | |
| Singapore | Arbitrary | Foreigners can register for citizenship after two years of permanent residence. | A minimum of 6 months legal residence is required to be eligible for permanent residence, resulting in the citizenship pathway/eligibility of 2.5 years. | No | Singaporean nationality law | |
| Slovakia | 8 years | | | Partial | Slovak nationality law | |
| Slovenia | 10 years | Total residence of 10 years. Continuous residence for 5 years prior to application. Reduced to 3 years for spouses of citizens. | | Partial | Slovenian nationality law | |
| Solomon Islands | 7 years | | | Yes | Solomon Islands nationality law | |
| Somalia | 7 years | | | Partial | Somali nationality law | |
| South Africa | 5 years | Continuous residence. | | Yes | South African nationality law | |
| South Korea | 5 years | Reduced to 3 years if married to a citizen. | Males are required to do military service. | Partial | South Korean nationality law | |
| South Sudan | 10 years | | | Yes | South Sudanese nationality law | |
| Spain | 10 years | Reduced to 2 years for natural-born nationals of Ibero-American countries, Portugal, Andorra, Equatorial Guinea, and the Philippines. | | Partial | Spanish nationality law | |
| Sri Lanka | 5 years | | | Partial | Sri Lankan nationality law | |
| St. Kitts and Nevis | 14 years | | | Yes | Kittitian and Nevisian nationality law | |
| St. Lucia | 7 years | | | Partial | Saint Lucian nationality law | |
| St. Vincent and the Grenadines | 7 years | | | Yes | Vincentian nationality law | |
| Sudan | 10 years | | | Yes | Sudanese nationality law | |
| Suriname | 5 years | | | No | Surinamese nationality law | |
| Sweden | 8 years | Continuous residence | | Yes | Swedish nationality law | |
| Switzerland | 10 years | Must hold C permit (settled foreign national). Years of residence between age of 8 and 18 count double, with a minimum of 6 years residence. | | Yes | Swiss nationality law | |
| Syria | 5 years | | | Yes | Syrian nationality law | |
| Taiwan | 5 years | | | Partial | Nationality law of the Republic of China | |
| Tajikistan | 5 years | | | Partial | Tajik nationality law | |
| Tanzania | 5 years | | | No | Tanzanian nationality law | |
| Thailand | 5 years | Continuous residence. Residence requirement waived for spouses and children of citizens. | | Partial | Thai nationality law | |
| Togo | 5 years | | | Yes | Togolese nationality law | |
| Tonga | 5 years | | | Yes | Tongan nationality law | |
| Trinidad and Tobago | 7 years | | | Yes | Trinidadian and Tobagonian nationality law | |
| Tunisia | 5 years | Continuous residence. | | Yes | Tunisian nationality law | |
| Turkey | 5 years | Continuous residence. | | Yes | Turkish nationality law | |
| Turkmenistan | 7 years | | | No | Turkmen nationality law | |
| Tuvalu | 7 years | | | Yes | Tuvaluan nationality law | |
| Uganda | 20 years | | Dual nationality permitted. Three or more nationalities not permitted. | Partial | Ugandan nationality law | |
| Ukraine | 5 years | | | Yes | Ukrainian nationality law | |
| United Arab Emirates | 30 years | Reduced to 7 years for citizens of Arab descent. Reduced to 3 years for citizens of Qatar, Oman, and Bahrain. | Multiple nationality allowed only in limited, exceptional cases since 2021. | Partial | Emirati nationality law | |
| United Kingdom | 5 years | Non-EU/EEA/Swiss citizens must have indefinite leave to remain (ILR) for 12 months before applying. Residency requirement for ILR is generally 5 years. | | Yes | British nationality law | |
| United States | 5 years | Continuous lawful permanent residence for 5 years. Reduced to 3 years for spouses of US citizens. Physical presence for at least 30 of the 60 months preceding the application. Cannot be absent for more than 6 months at a time. | | Yes | United States nationality law | |
| Uruguay | 5 years (Legal Citizenship, not nationality) | Reduced to 3 years if residing with spouse or children (Legal Citizenship, not nationality). | Uruguay distinguishes between citizenship and nationality and does not offer a naturalization path for immigrants. Uruguayan nationals are persons who were born in Uruguay or are children or grandchildren of Uruguayan natural citizens. Legal citizenship has special characteristics, the persons who acquire it keep their nationality of origin. Legal citizens acquire political rights but do not acquire nationality as natural citizens do. This peculiar distinction between citizenship and nationality has caused problems with legal citizens' passports at airports around the world and restricted their freedom of movement. | Yes | Uruguayan nationality law | |
| Uzbekistan | 5 years | | | No | Uzbek nationality law | |
| Vanuatu | 10 years | | | Yes | Nationality law of Vanuatu | |
| Vatican City | N/A | | | Yes | Vatican City citizenship | |
| Venezuela | 10 years | Reduced to 5 years for natural-born citizens of Spain, Portugal, Italy, Latin American or Caribbean countries. | | Yes | Venezuelan nationality law | |
| Vietnam | 5 years | | The state only recognizes Vietnamese citizens with one nationality, unless otherwise provided. | Partial | Vietnamese nationality law | |
| Yemen | 5 years | | | No | Yemeni nationality law | |
| Zambia | 5 years | | | Yes | Zambian nationality law | |
| Zimbabwe | 5 years | | | Yes | Zimbabwean nationality law | |

== Laws by country ==
=== Australia ===
The Australian Citizenship Act 1973 ended the preferential treatment for British subjects from 1 December 1973. People who became permanent residents from 1 July 2007 must have been lawfully resident in Australia for four years before applying for citizenship by conferral. Those who were present in Australia as permanent residents before 1 July 2007 remain subject to the previous residence requirement (in force since 1984, e.g. resident for two years).

=== People's Republic of China ===
The People's Republic of China gives citizenship to people with one or two parents with Chinese nationality who have not taken residence in other countries. The country also gives citizenship to people born on its territory to stateless people who have settled there. Furthermore, individuals may apply for nationality if they have a near relative with Chinese nationality, if they have settled in China, or if they present another legitimate reason. In practice, few people gain Chinese citizenship; as of 2010, China had only 1,448 naturalised Chinese in total.

The naturalization process starts with a written application. Applicants must submit three copies, written with a ball-point or fountain pen, to national authorities, and to provincial authorities in the Ministry of Public Security and the Public Security Bureau. Applicants must also submit original copies of a foreign passport, a residence permit, a permanent residence permit, and four two-and-a-half inch long pictures. According to the conditions outlined in the Nationality Law of the People's Republic of China, authorities may also require "any other material that the authority believes are related to the nationality application".

=== France ===
People who fulfil all of the following criteria can obtain French citizenship through naturalisation:

- At least 5 years' residence, although reduced to the following minimum periods in certain situations:
  - 2 years:
    - Successfully completed 2 years of studies with a view to obtaining a degree or diploma at a French higher educational institution;
    - Made an exceptional contribution to France's standing and influence in the arts, science, sport, culture, academia, entrepreneurship, etc.
  - No minimum residence period:
    - Performed military service with the French Army;
    - Served voluntarily in wartime in the French Army or an allied army;
    - Rendered exceptional service to France (requires personal ministerial approval);
    - Attained the official status of a refugee in France;
    - Citizen of a member state of the Organisation internationale de la Francophonie and have French as their native language or have completed at least 5 years of schooling in a French-speaking educational establishment.
- Integration into French society, including adhering to the values and principles of the Republic, and having a sufficient knowledge of French history, culture and society;
- Sufficient spoken command of the French language;
- No serious criminal convictions, defined as follows:
  - Never been sentenced to more than 6 months' imprisonment (not including suspended sentences) for any crime (unless the applicant has been legally deemed rehabilitated or the sentence has been wiped from their criminal record);
  - Never been convicted of any crime that counters France's fundamental interests (unless the applicant has been legally deemed rehabilitated or the sentence has been wiped from their criminal record);
  - Never been convicted of any act of terrorism (unless the applicant has been legally deemed rehabilitated or the sentence has been wiped from their criminal record).

The fee for naturalisation is €55, except in French Guiana, where it is €27.50.

=== Germany ===
People who fulfil all of the following criteria can obtain German citizenship through naturalisation:

- At least 5 years' residence in Germany with a valid residence permit. This minimum period is reduced as follows:
  - 3 years for people who have successfully completed the Integrationskurs or for spouses and registered same-sex partners of a German citizen (must have been married or in the registered partnership for at least 2 years at the time of application).
- Declaring allegiance to the German Constitution;
- Sufficient command of the German language;
- No serious criminal convictions.

The dependent minor children of an applicant for naturalisation may also themselves become naturalised German citizens.

The fee for standard naturalisation is €255, while it is €51 per dependent minor child naturalised along with their parent. The fee may be waived in cases of extreme hardship or public interest.

Prior to 27 June 2024, people naturalising as German citizens were generally required give up their previous nationality, with exceptions made for EU and Swiss citizens (provided that the law of their country of origin did not prohibit the acquisition of another citizenship) and citizens of countries where renouncing one's citizenship was too difficult or humiliating (e.g. Afghanistan), prohibitively expensive (e.g. the United States) or legally impossible (e.g. Argentina). The Act on the Modernization of Citizenship Law that came into force in 2024 made multiple citizenship possible.

=== Grenada ===
The Grenadian Government grants citizenship of Grenada for the following reasons:

- By Birth
  - Any person born in Grenada after 1974 or later acquires Grenadian citizenship at birth. The exception is for children born to diplomat parents.
- By Descent
  - Children born outside Grenada to a Grenadian-born parent.
- By Registration
  - Children (over 18) born outside of Grenada to a Grenadian parent.
  - Children (under 18) born outside of Grenada to a Grenadian parent.
  - A person who was born outside of Grenada who is a Grandchild of a Grenadian citizen by birth.
  - A person who is/or has been married to a citizen of Grenada.
  - Citizens of Caribbean Countries may apply for citizenship by registration provided that person has been living in Grenada for 4 years and 2 years as a Permanent Resident (within the four-year period) immediately preceding the date of application.
  - Commonwealth & Irish citizens may apply for citizenship by registration provided that the person has been living in Grenada for 7 years and 2 years as a Permanent Resident (within the seven-year period) immediately preceding the date of application.
- By Naturalisation
- An Alien or a British Protected Person may apply for citizenship by naturalisation provided that the person has been living in Grenada for 7 years and 2 years as a Permanent Resident (within the seven-year period) immediately preceding the date of application..

=== India ===
The Indian citizenship and nationality law and the Constitution of India provides single citizenship for the entire country. The provisions relating to citizenship at the commencement of the Constitution are contained in Articles 5 to 11 in Part II of the Constitution of India. Relevant Indian legislation is the Citizenship Act 1955, which has been amended by the Citizenship (Amendment) Act 1986, the Citizenship (Amendment) Act 1992, the Citizenship (Amendment) Act 2003, and Citizenship (Amendment) Ordinance 2005. The Citizenship (Amendment) Act 2003 received the assent of the President of India on 7 January 2004 and came into force on 3 December 2004. The Citizenship (Amendment) Ordinance 2005 was promulgated by the President of India and came into force on 28 June 2005.

Following these reforms, Indian nationality law largely follows the jus sanguinis (citizenship by right of blood) as opposed to the jus soli (citizenship by right of birth within the territory).

In 2019, a Citizenship Amendment Act was passed by the Parliament of India. This Act aims at fast tracking citizenship for illegal immigrants and refugees fleeing religious persecution for people of Hindu, Sikh, Buddhist, Jain, Parsi or Christian faiths who have entered India on or before 31 December 2014 from the neighbouring countries of Pakistan, Afghanistan and Bangladesh.

=== Italy ===
The Italian Government grants Italian citizenship for the following reasons.

- Automatically
  - Jus sanguinis: for birth;
  - If an Italian citizen recognizes, at a time after birth, a minor child;
  - For adoption;
  - To obtain or re-obtain from a parent.
- Following declaration
  - By descent;
  - Jus soli: by birth or descent in Italy;
- By marriage or naturalization
  - By marriage: the foreign or stateless spouse of an Italian citizen may acquire Italian citizenship after two years of legal residence in Italy or, if residing abroad, after three years from the date of marriage;
  - By naturalization: the foreigner can apply for Italian citizenship after ten years of legal residence in Italy, reduced to five years for those who have been recognized as stateless or refugee and four years for citizens of countries of the European Community.
- Sufficient command of the Italian language.

=== Indonesia ===
Indonesian nationality is regulated by Law No. 12/2006 (UU No. 12 Tahun 2006). The Indonesian nationality law is based on jus sanguinis and jus soli. The Indonesian nationality law does not recognize dual citizenship except for people under the age of 18 (limited double citizenship principle). After reaching 18 years of age individuals are forced to choose one citizenship (single citizenship principle).

A foreign citizen can apply to become an Indonesian citizen with the following requirements:

- Age 18 or older, or married
- Resided in Indonesia for a minimum of 5 consecutive years or 10 non-consecutive years
- Physically and mentally healthy
- Ability to speak Indonesian and acknowledge Pancasila and Undang-Undang Dasar Negara Republik Indonesia Tahun 1945
- Never convicted of a crime for which the punishment is imprisonment for one year or more
- If having Indonesian citizenship will not give the person dual citizenship
- Employed or have fixed income
- Pay citizenship fee

Any application for citizenship is granted by the President of Indonesia.

=== Israel ===
Israel's Declaration of Independence was made on 14 May 1948, the day before the British Mandate was due to expire as a result of the United Nations Partition Plan. The Israeli parliament created two laws regarding immigration, citizenship and naturalization: the Law of Return and the Israeli citizenship law. The Law of Return, enacted on July 15, 1950, gives Jews living anywhere in the world the right to immigrate to Israel. This right to immigrate did not and still does not grant citizenship. In fact, for four years after Israel gained independence, there were no Israeli citizens.

On July 14, 1952, the Israeli parliament enacted the Israeli Nationality Law. The Nationality Law naturalized all citizens of Mandated Palestine, the inhabitants of Israel on July 15, 1952, and those who had legally resided in Israel between May 14, 1948, and July 14, 1952. The law further clarified that naturalization was available to immigrants who had arrived before Israel's creation, immigrants who arrived after statehood was granted, and those who did not come to Israel as immigrants but have since expressed desire to settle in Israel, with restriction. Naturalization applicants must also meet the following requirements: be over 18 years of age, have resided in Israel for three out of the five preceding years, have settled or intend to settle permanently in Israel, have some knowledge of Hebrew, and have renounced prior nationality or demonstrated ability to renounce nationality after becoming a citizen of Israel.

Because of Israel's relatively new and culturally mixed identity, Israel does not grant citizenship to people born on Israeli soil. Instead, the government chose to enact a jus sanguinis system, with the naturalization restrictions listed above. There is currently no legislation on second-generation immigrants (those born in Israel to immigrant parents). Furthermore, foreign spouses can apply for citizenship through the Minister of the Interior, but have a variety of restrictions and are not guaranteed citizenship.

=== Luxembourg ===
People who fulfill all of the following criteria can obtain Luxembourg citizenship through naturalisation:

- At least 18 years old.
- At least five total years of legal residence in Luxembourg, including an uninterrupted period of one year immediately before applying for citizenship.
- Passing a Luxembourgish language exam.
- Taking a course on "Living together in the Grand Duchy" (Vivre ensemble au Grand-Duché du Luxembourg) or passing the associated examination.
- Not having been handed an immediate custodial sentence of 12 months or more or a suspended custodial sentence of 24 months or more, in any country, unless the sentence was definitively served more than fifteen years prior to the application for naturalization.

=== Malaysia ===
Naturalisation in Malaysia is guided by the 1964 Malaysian Constitution. According to the law, those who want to be the country citizen should live in the country for a period of 10–12 years. The would-be-citizens are required to speak the Malay language as well submitting the identity cards of two Malaysians who recommend the applicant for citizenship. As the Government of Malaysia does not recognise dual citizenship, those who seek naturalisation are needed to reside permanently in the country and renouncing their former country citizenship.

The requirements are as follows:

- The applicant shall appear before the Registrar of Citizenship when submitting the application.
- The applicant must be aged 21 years and above on the date of the application.
- The applicant has resided in the federation for a period of not less than 10 years in a period of 12 years, including the 12 months immediately preceding the date of application.
- The applicant intends to reside permanently in the federation.
- The applicant is of good character.
- The applicant has adequate knowledge of the Malay language.
- The applicant must be sponsored by two referees who are citizens aged 21 years and above and who are not relatives, not hired people, and not advocates or solicitors to the applicant.
- Form C must be completed and submitted together with copies of the necessary documents.

The Article 16 of 1957 Malaysian Constitution also stated a similar condition previously.

=== Philippines ===
Commonwealth Act No. 473, the Revised Naturalization Law, approved June 17, 1939, provided that people having certain specified qualifications may become a citizen of the Philippines by naturalization. Republic Act No. 9139, approved June 8, 2001, provided that aliens under the age of 18 who were born in the Philippines, who have resided in the Philippines since birth, and who possess other specified qualifications may be granted Philippines citizenship by administrative proceeding subject to certain requirements.

=== Russia ===
Naturalization in Russia is guided by articles 13 and 14 of the federal law "About Citizenship of Russian Federation" passed on May 31, 2002. Citizenship of Russia can be obtained in general or simplified order. To become a citizen in general order, one must be 18 years of age or older, continuously live in Russia as a permanent resident for at least five years (this term is limited to one year for valued specialists, political asylum seekers and refugees), have legal means of existence, promise to obey the laws and Constitution of Russia and be fluent in the Russian language.

There is also a possibility to naturalize in a simplified order, in which certain requirements will be waived. Eligible for that are people, at least one parent of whom is a Russian citizen living on Russian territory; people, who lived on the territories of the former Soviet republics but never obtained citizenships of those nations after they gained independence; people, who were born on the territory of RSFSR and formerly held Soviet citizenship; people married to Russian citizens for at least 3 years; people, who served in Russian Armed Forces under contract for at least 3 years; parents of mentally incapacitated children over 18 who are Russian citizens; participants of the State Program for Assisting Compatriots Residing Abroad; and some other categories.

=== Spain ===
People who fulfill all of the following criteria can obtain Spanish citizenship through naturalisation

- At least 10 years' residence in Spain. This period is reduced to 5 years for people who have obtained refugee status; 2 years for nationals of Ibero-American countries, Andorra, the Philippines, Equatorial Guinea, Portugal or persons of Sephardic origin; 1 year for spouses, widows, widowers, people born in Spain or by a Spanish mother or father.
- Sufficient command of the Spanish language and culture;
- Declaring allegiance to the Spanish Constitution;
- No serious criminal convictions.

People who naturalise as Spanish citizens must usually give up their previous nationality, as Spanish law takes a restrictive approach to multiple citizenship.

=== South Africa ===
Chapter 2 of the South African Citizenship Act, enacted on October 6, 1995, defines who is considered a naturalized citizen at the time of the act and also outlines the naturalization process for future immigrants.

Any person who immediately prior to the commencement of the act had been a South African citizen via naturalization, had been deemed to be a South African citizen by registration, or had been a citizen via naturalization of any of the former states now composing South Africa is now considered to be a naturalized citizen of South Africa.

Those wishing to apply for naturalization in the future must apply to the Minister of Home Affairs and must meet a slew of requirements. First, naturalization applicants must be over the age of 18 and must have been a permanent resident of South Africa for five years prior to application (prior to 2010, the permanent residence requirement was one year prior to application and for four out of the eight years prior to application). Applicants must also demonstrate good character and knowledge of the basic responsibilities and privileges of a South African citizen. The ability to communicate in one of the official languages of South Africa is also required. Applicants must show the intention to reside in South Africa after naturalization, and they are required to make a declaration of allegiance. The Constitution of South Africa states that national legislation must provide for the acquisition, loss and restoration of citizenship.

Being a naturalized South African citizen is a privilege, not a right. Even after meeting all the requirements and going through the naturalization process, the minister holds the right to deny citizenship. Foreign spouses of South African citizens can apply for naturalization after two years of marriage, but is subject to potential denial of the minister. The minister can also grant citizenship to minors, if their parent applies for them.

The minister also holds the power to revoke naturalization at any time for specific reasons listed in the Act. Reasons for revoking the naturalization certificate include marrying someone who is a citizen of another country and holding citizenship in another country, or applying for citizenship of another country without prior authorization for retention of citizenship. If a permanent resident is denied naturalization, he or she must wait at least one year before reapplying.

=== United Kingdom ===
There has always been a distinction in the law of England and Wales between the subjects of the monarch and aliens: the monarch's subjects owed the monarch allegiance, and included those born in his or her dominions (natural-born subjects) and those who later gave him or her their allegiance (naturalised subjects). Today, the requirements for naturalisation as a citizen of the United Kingdom depend on whether or not one is the spouse or civil partner of a citizen. An applicant who is a spouse or civil partner of a British citizen must:

- hold indefinite leave to remain in the UK (or an equivalent such as Right of Abode or Irish citizenship)
- have lived legally in the UK for three years
- been outside of the UK no more than 90 days during the one-year period prior to filing the application.
- show sufficient knowledge of life in the UK, either by passing the Life in the United Kingdom test or by attending combined English language and citizenship classes. Proof of this must be supplied with one's application for naturalisation. Those aged 65 or over may be able to claim exemption.
- meet specified English, Welsh or Scottish Gaelic language competence standards.

For those not married to or in a civil partnership with a British citizen, the requirements are:

- Five years legal residence in the UK
- Indefinite leave to remain or "equivalent" for this purpose (see above) must have been held for 12 months
- the applicant must intend to continue to live in the UK or work overseas for the UK government or a British corporation or association
- the same "good character" standards apply as for those married to British citizens
- the same language and knowledge of life in the UK standards apply as for those married to British citizens.

=== United States ===
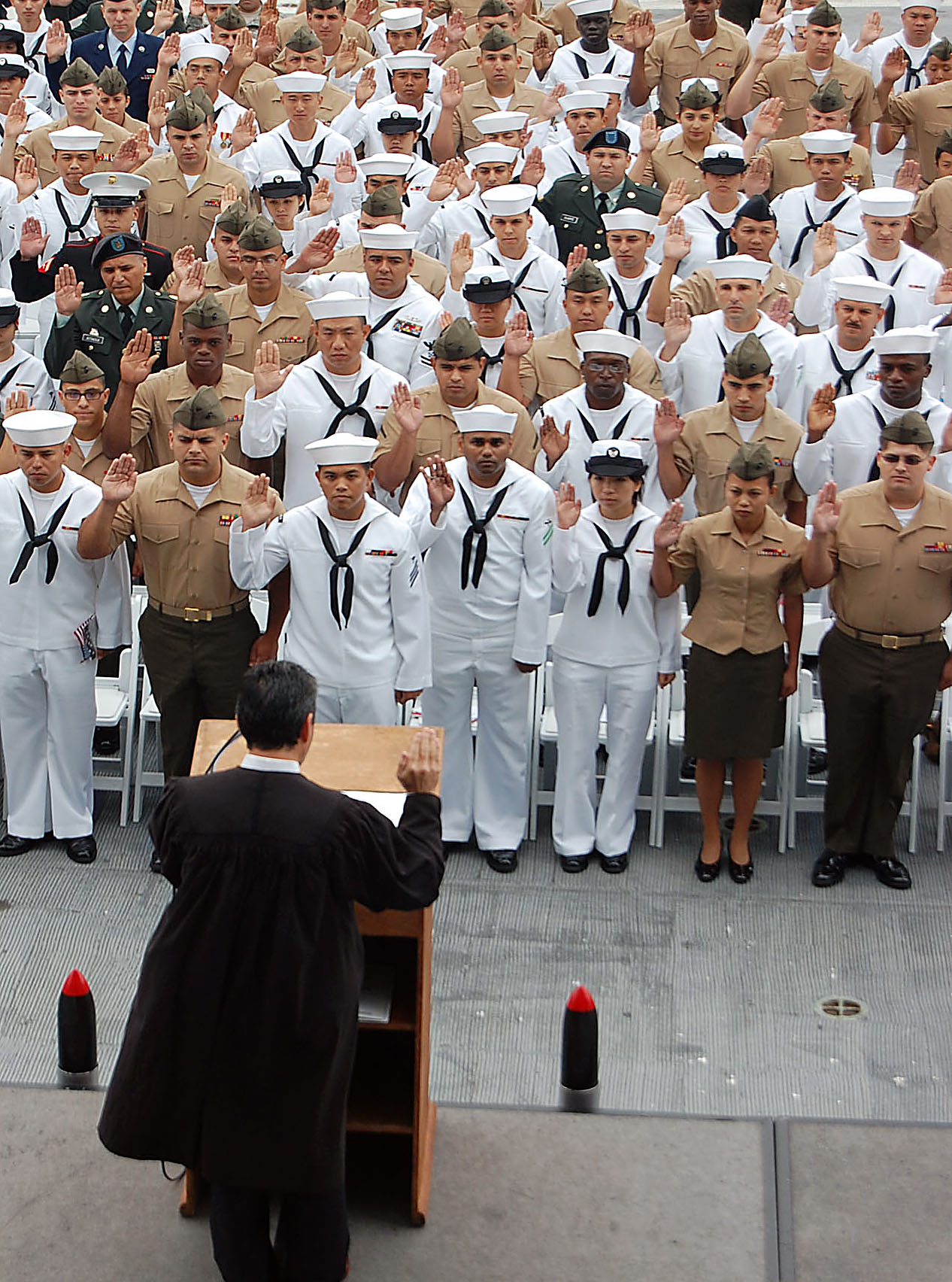
United States service members are sworn in as citizens of the United States aboard the USS Midway in 2009.

Persons who are not US citizens may receive citizenship through the process of naturalization, following the Congressional requirements in the Immigration and Nationality Act (INA).

The INA states the following:

No person, except as otherwise provided in this subchapter, shall be naturalized unless such applicant, (1) immediately preceding the date of filing his application for naturalization has resided continuously, after being lawfully admitted for permanent residence, within the United States for at least five years and during the five years immediately preceding the date of filing his application has been physically present therein for periods totaling at least half of that time, and who has resided within the State or within the district of the Service in the United States in which the applicant filed the application for at least three months, (2) has resided continuously within the United States from the date of the application up to the time of admission to citizenship, and (3) during all the periods referred to in this subsection has been and still is a person of good moral character, attached to the principles of the Constitution of the United States, and well disposed to the good order and happiness of the United States.

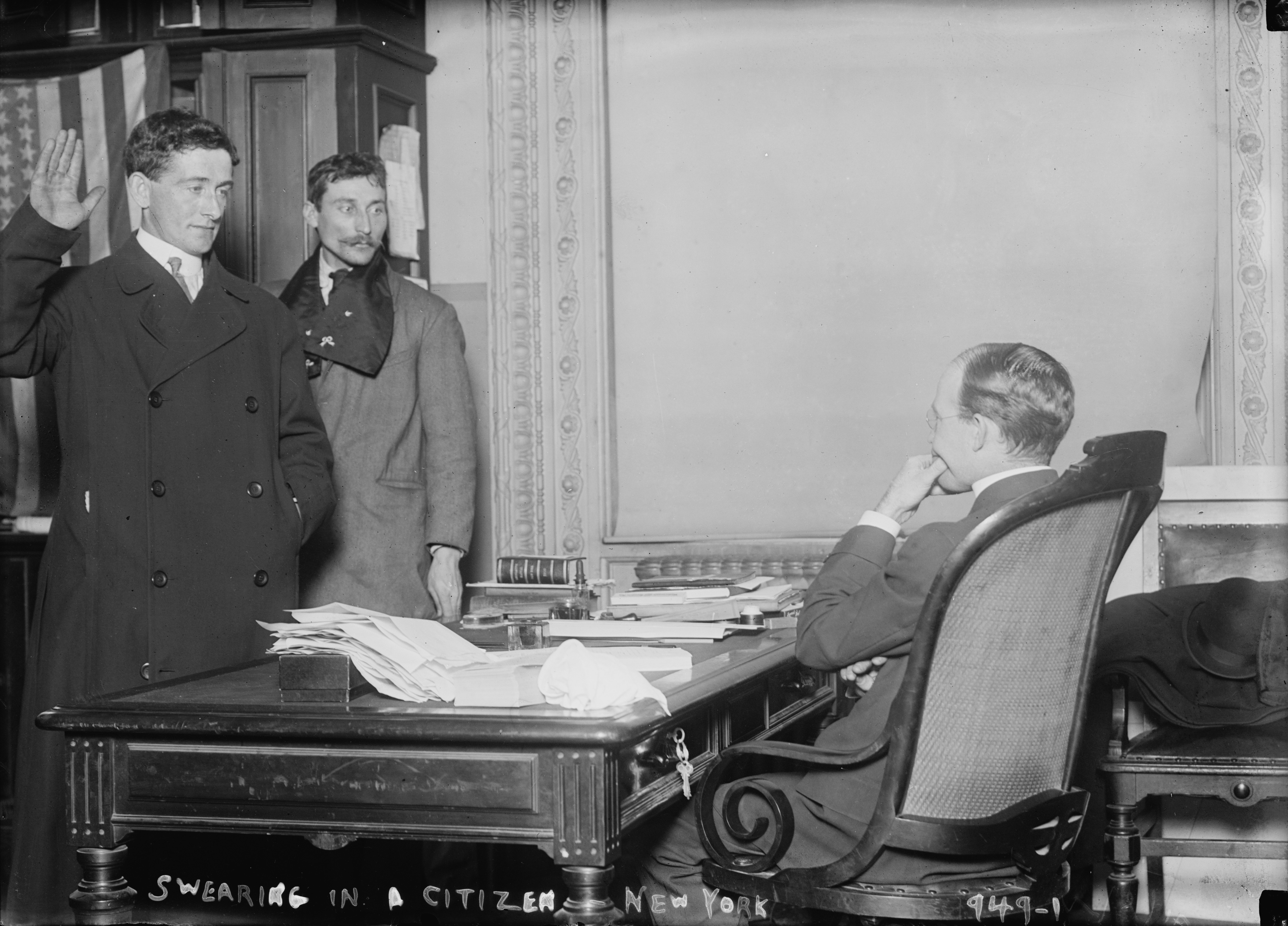
A man taking the required citizenship oath of allegiance in front of US government officials in New York City (1910)

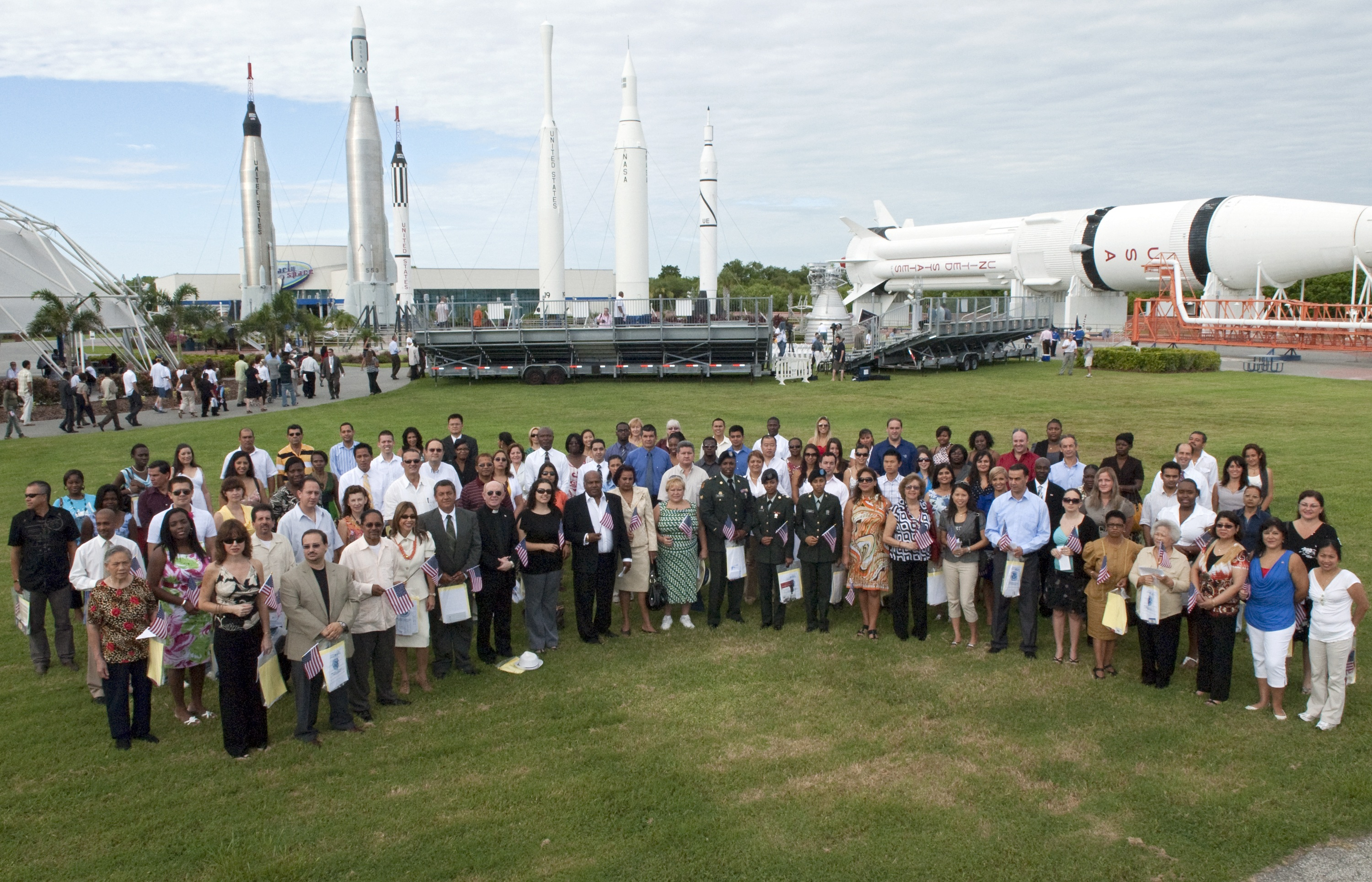
New citizens at a naturalization ceremony at Kennedy Space Center in Florida (2010)

The Naturalization Act of 1795 set the initial rules on naturalization: "free, White persons" who had been resident for five years or more. An 1862 law allowed honorably discharged Army veterans of any war to petition for naturalization after only one year of residence in the United States. An 1894 law extended the same privilege to honorably discharged five-year veterans of the Navy or Marine Corps. Laws enacted in 1919, 1926, 1940, and 1952 continued preferential treatment provisions for veterans.

Following the Spanish–American War in 1898, Philippine citizens were classified as US nationals, and the 1917 Jones–Shafroth Act granted US citizenship to natives of Puerto Rico. But the 1934 Tydings–McDuffie Act reclassified Filipinos as aliens, and set a quota of 50 immigrants per year, and otherwise applying the Immigration Act of 1924 to them.

The Magnuson Act repealed the Chinese Exclusion Act. During the 1940s, 100 annual immigrants from British India and the Philippines were allowed. The War Brides Act of 1945 permitted soldiers to bring back their foreign wives and established precedent in naturalization through marriage. The Immigration Act of 1965 finally allowed people from all nations to be given equal access to immigration and naturalization.

Illegal immigration became a major issue in the United States at the end of the 20th century. The Immigration Reform and Control Act of 1986, while tightening border controls, also provided the opportunity of naturalization for illegal aliens who had been in the country for at least four years. Today, lawful permanent residents of the United States are eligible to apply for US citizenship after five years, unless they continue to be married to a US citizen, in which case they can apply after only three years of permanent residency.

The Child Citizenship Act of 2000 streamlined the naturalization process for children adopted internationally. A child under age 18 who is adopted by at least one US citizen parent, and is in the custody of the citizen parent(s), is now automatically naturalized once admitted to the United States as an immigrant or when legally adopted in the United States, depending on the visa under which the child was admitted to the United States. The Act also provides that the non-citizen minor child of a newly naturalized US citizen, whether by birth or adoption, also automatically receives US citizenship.

== See also ==
- Bancroft Treaties
- Citizenship
- Convention on the Reduction of Statelessness
- European Convention on Nationality
- History of citizenship
- Immigration lawyer
- Integration of immigrants
- Permanent residency
