= Soviet citizenship law =

On Citizenship of the USSR О гражданстве СССР

Supreme Soviet of the Soviet Union
- Citation: N 1518-1
- Territorial extent: Soviet Union
- Enacted by: Supreme Soviet of the Soviet Union
- Signed by: President of the Soviet Union
- Signed: 23 May 1990

Repeals
- Закон СССР от 01.12.1978 № 8497-IX (On Citizenship of the USSR, 01.12.1978)
- Status: Void

Soviet citizenship law controlled who was considered a citizen of the Union of Soviet Socialist Republics, and by extension, each of the Republics of the Soviet Union, during that country's existence. The citizenship laws were only in rough form from about 1917 to 1923, taking more definite form in 1924. There were several major changes in the citizenship law, especially in 1931, 1938, and 1978 and 1990. Soviet law originally expanded the bounds of jus sanguinis and citizenship by residence more than was common among European countries, before tending to gradually retract from that over time. Soviet citizenship law was also used as a political tool to expand the number of Soviet citizens globally, increase military conscription pools, and punish dissenters or even entire ethnic groups. A Soviet citizen was entitled to a Soviet passport.

== Early situation on citizenship ==
After the Russian Revolution, between 1917 and 1923, citizenship questions were subject to the control of various bodies in the "numerous independent and semi-independent republics and regions."

Earlier leaders did not focus on citizenship law, because they believed that an ongoing worldwide Communist revolution would eventually join all persons on the world into one larger Communist citizenship.

The 1918 constitution of the Russian SFSR did not draw a clear distinction between citizens and non-citizens, instead simply extending rights of Russian citizens to non-citizens within the Russian Republic.

While residents of the Russian Empire were initially welcomed by the government to return, after the Russian Civil War, the Bolshevik party leadership engaged in mass denaturalization of Russians who had left.

The 1923 USSR constitution established a single uniform USSR citizenship for all citizens of the SSRs.

It was not until October 29, 1924 that the first comprehensive citizenship laws or regulations came into effect in the USSR, making it difficult to determine citizenship status until then.

The first comprehensive Soviet law on citizenship, in 1924, established USSR citizenship, status of foreigners, citizenship at birth, citizenship effect on children of their parents, and naturalization. A 1930 revision modified a few details. It also greatly expanded the power to denaturalize citizens.

== First comprehensive laws ==
The "Statute on Citizenship of the Union of the S.S.R. of April 22, 1931" laid out Soviet laws on citizenship.

All citizens of the USSR were also citizens of an SSR, and all citizens of the SSRs were also citizens of the USSR.

Citizenship in the individual SSRs "formally existed but had no practical or political consequences" because it was subsumed into USSR citizenship. Experts believes that SSR citizenship was largely non-existent.

All persons in the USSR were citizens unless proved to be a citizen of a foreign state. The rule avoids statelessness, and also "subject[s] every one who cannot prove his foreign citizenship to the strict surveillance to which all citizens are subjected." It also had the effect of building the potential pool of military recruits for conscription.

Any person born of a parent who was a citizen of the USSR was also a citizen of the USSR, which extended the principle of the previous imperial regime. This practice continued through Stalin's 1938 "On USSR Citizenship" law, in order to broaden the number of Soviet citizens.

This includes children born outside wedlock. No process of renunciation was given for those living inside the USSR.

Marriage to a USSR citizen did not automatically confer citizenship, which was seen as a break from European bourgeois customs. The citizenship of a child under 14 generally changes with the citizenship of the parents, either to or away from USSR citizenship, but did not do so automatically if the parents' citizenships differed, which was also seen as a break from European custom.

A Soviet citizenship act number 198 was enacted on August 19, 1938, consisting of only eight articles instead of its predecessor's 29 articles.

It was originally designed to replace all earlier Soviet citizenship regulations and laws, until that provision was removed, as it was too terse to provide substantial guidance, so that only conflicting earlier provisions were replaced. The 1938 law no longer stated that all persons in Soviet territory were presumed to be citizens. It created officially stateless persons who did not have Soviet citizenship and could not prove other citizenship. The 1931 act was repealed in 1939.

== Practical application ==
Details of naturalization in the 1931 law were deliberately kept vague, so as to provide full power to administrative authorities to decide upon who might be admitted to citizenship.

In theory, Soviet citizenship law was very inclusive. There were no official requirements for residency; knowledge of language, history, constitution, or political system; minimum income; or the like. All that was required was an application and renunciation of other citizenships, and specifying of a particular SSR citizenship.

In the period leading up to the 1938 law, the Soviet political system made strong use of deprivation of citizenship and reinstatement as instrument of discipline and sanction. Entire groups or categories were stripped of citizenship or the rights of citizenship.

== 1940s regional citizenship laws ==
In the 1940s a variety of decrees concerning USSR citizenship for persons from specific areas and regions were enacted, including:

- Lithuanian, Latvian, and Estonian SSRs, on September 7, 1940
- Bessarabia and northern Bukovina, on March 8, 1941
- former Russian Manchuria on November 10, 1945
- former Russian territories in Xinjiang, Shanghai, and Tianjin, on January 20, 1946
- Soviet Armenia, on October 19, 1946
- Czechoslovakia, on October 31, 1946
- Klaipėda, Šilutė, and Pagėgiai, Lithuanian SSR, on December 16, 1947

In February 1947, the USSR prohibited marriage between citizens of the USSR and aliens, but repealed that law in November 1953. In March 1948, the USSR laid out procedures for Lithuanian, Latvian, and Estonian nationals living in Latin America to acquire Soviet citizenship.

A 1954 citizenship decree that reinstated the 1931 citizenship regulations changed the outlines of who was a Soviet citizen by stating that all persons who have "long resided" in Soviet territory were Soviet citizens, including those persons who had been denied citizenship.

== Late changes ==
Changes to the USSR's citizenship laws were also enacted by 1977 constitution and the December 1, 1978 law on citizenship, with the latest change being in 1990.

== Post-Soviet citizenships ==
After the dissolution of the Soviet Union in 1991, the following citizenship laws came into effect in the following post-Soviet states:

Country	General residence for naturalization	Multiple citizenship	Main article	First adopted	Ref
Armenia	3 years	Yes	Armenian nationality law	1995	
Azerbaijan	5 years	No	Azerbaijani nationality law	1995	
Belarus	7 years	Yes	Belarusian nationality law	1991	
Estonia	8 years	Partial	Estonian nationality law	1995	
Georgia	10 years	No	Georgian nationality law	1993	
Kazakhstan	5 years	No	Kazakhstani nationality law	1991	
Kyrgyzstan	5 years	Partial	Kyrgyz nationality law	2007	
Latvia	10 years	Partial	Latvian nationality law	1994	
Lithuania	10 years	No	Lithuanian nationality law	1989	
Moldova	10 years	Yes	Moldovan nationality law	1991	
Russia	5 years	Yes	Russian nationality law	1991	
Tajikistan	5 years	Partial	Tajik nationality law	2008	
Turkmenistan	7 years	No	Turkmen nationality law	2008	
Ukraine	5 years	No	Ukrainian nationality law	2001	
Uzbekistan	5 years	No	Uzbek nationality law	1992	
