= Zambian nationality law =

Citizenship of Zambia Act

National Assembly of Zambia
- Enacted by: Government of Zambia
- Status: Current legislation

Zambian nationality law is regulated by the Constitution of Zambia, as amended; the Citizenship of Zambia Act; and various international agreements to which the country is a signatory. These laws determine who is, or is eligible to be, a national of Zambia. The legal means to acquire nationality, formal legal membership in a nation, differ from the domestic relationship of rights and obligations between a national and the nation, known as citizenship. Nationality describes the relationship of an individual to the state under international law, whereas citizenship is the domestic relationship of an individual within the nation. Commonwealth countries often use the terms nationality and citizenship as synonyms, despite their legal distinction and the fact that they are regulated by different governmental administrative bodies. Zambian nationality is typically obtained under the principals of jus soli, i.e. birth in Zambia, or jus sanguinis, i.e. by birth to parents with Zambian nationality. It can be granted to persons with an affiliation to the country, or to a permanent resident who has lived in the country for a given period of time through registration.

== Acquiring Zambian nationality ==
Nationality can be obtained in Zambia at birth or later in life through a registration process equivalent to naturalisation.

=== By birth ===
Since 2016, provisions to acquire nationality in Zambia include both birth in the territory and by descent from a Zambian. Those who are eligible for nationality by birth include:

- Persons born anywhere, including on board an aircraft of ship registered in Zambia or owned by the Zambian government, who have at least one parent who is, or was at the time of their birth, a national of Zambia; or
- Foundlings or orphans under the age of eight whose parents are unknown or whose nationality cannot be ascertained, upon receipt of a court order from the Children's Court Division of the High Court of Zambia.

=== By registration ===
Registration can be granted to persons who have resided in Zambia for a sufficient period of time to confirm they understand the English or another language of Zambia, the customs and traditions of the country and the responsibilities of citizenship. It is a discretionary process, not an administrative one. General qualification is that the applicant is at least eighteen years old, can verify legal residency of a minimum of ten years, has not been convicted of a crime that carried a prison sentence, has not been bankrupt, and is not a prohibited immigrant. Besides foreigners meeting the criteria, those who can register include:

- Adoptees may acquire Zambian nationality by registration, upon completion of the legal adoption process;
- The spouse of a Zambian national may register as Zambian after the marriage has endured for at least five years;
- Persons who were born in Zambia who have been ordinary residents in Zambia for at least five years; or
- Persons born abroad but who descend from a Zambian national after a five-year residency.

== Loss of nationality ==
Zambians are allowed to renounce their nationality, provided that they comply with registration processes. If the person has not acquired another nationality within six months, Zambian nationality will automatically be restored. Persons who committed fraud, misrepresentation, or concealment in a registration application may be denaturalised. Persons who were Zambian and previously lost their nationality may apply for repatriation by a process known as Citizenship for Bestowal, which requires detailed biographical information and about their loss of nationality.

== Dual nationality ==
Since 2016, Zambia has allowed dual nationality for most persons, though a simple registration process is required.

== History ==
Anthropologists have dated remains in the area spanning 30,000 to 100,000 years ago and attributed those inhabitants to be ancestors of Khoisan speakers and Pygmy peoples who reside in the territory today. From the fourth century, Bantu-speakers migrated into the area and engaged in trade. By the eleventh century, Arab and Indian traders participated in the exchange of goods along the Zambezi River. Between the thirteenth and seventeenth centuries, major migrations of people from the Congo Basin settled in the area. Though the Portuguese explorer António Fernandes visited the area in 1514, they did not establish settlements, but did become involved in trade. By the first part of the nineteenth century, the northern part of the region was dominated by Bemba Kingdom and the Lunda Confederation; the southeast was controlled by the Chewa Kingdom until they were displaced by invading Ngoni people mid-century; and the western part of the territory was governed in Barotseland by the Lozi Nation. These centralised polities, overpowered the earlier inhabitants and attempted to expand their territories. The south did not develop a centralised kingdom, but society was heavily influenced by Tonga tradition. The Kololo people, a subgroup of the Sotho-Tswana people of South Africa also migrated during the middle of the nineteenth century to the Barotseland area. Approximately seventy-two indigenous ethnic groups resided in the territory prior to colonisation. These groups were governed under tribal customs tied to the territories they controlled and their traditions.

In 1851, British missionary and explorer David Livingstone wrote about his travels through the Zambezi River basin, inspiring other missionaries to follow his path. Colonists and merchants hoping to open new markets for trade followed. These groups were met with resistance by the local inhabitants and the Portuguese traders. In 1884, British mining magnate Cecil Rhodes convinced Parliament to grant him a charter to develop the region and protect it from expansion of the Portuguese. Under the charter, for the British South Africa Company, Rhodes sent agents to secure agreements from local chiefs to cede mineral rights to the area in exchange for weapons. In 1889, Rhodes had secured agreements with the Lozi's king, Lewanika, in Barotziland and the northwestern part of the territory, which recognised his authority over his people. Despite the treaty being signed, the British South Africa Company did not assign an administrator to govern until the middle of 1895. In 1900, Rhodes secured agreements to protect North-Eastern Rhodesia. By virtue of the charter for the British South Africa Company Britain acquired extraterritorial jurisdiction over British subjects, but had no authority over the indigenous people in the territories operated by the company. The company would extend its control throughout the interior of the area until 1924.

=== British protectorates (1900–1958) ===
By a 28 November 1899 Order in Council, effective in 1900, Britain created a formal protectorate over Barotziland and North-Western Rhodesia. In 1911, this protectorate, as well as North-Eastern Rhodesia, were combined into the single administrative unit called Northern Rhodesia, though North-Eastern Rhodesia was not an official British protectorate until 1923. In 1924, the territory under the control of the British South Africa Company was formally transferred to the Colonial Office. On 3 September 1953, the protectorates of Northern Rhodesia and Nyasaland were united with the Colony of Southern Rhodesia into the Federation of Rhodesia and Nyasaland. Though part of the federation, Northern Rhodesia remained a British protectorate, even after 1 March 1958, when the Federation of Rhodesia and Nyassaland gained independence.

In Britain, allegiance, in which subjects pledged to support a monarch, was the precursor to the modern concept of nationality. The crown recognised from 1350 that all persons born within the territories of the British Empire were subjects. Those born outside the realm — except children of those serving in an official post abroad, children of the monarch, and children born on a British ship — were considered by common law to be foreigners. Marriage did not affect the status of a subject of the realm, but under common law, single women, including divorcées, were not allowed to be parents thus their children could not derive nationality maternally and were stateless unless legitimated by their father. British Nationality Acts did not extend beyond the bounds of the United Kingdom of Great Britain and Ireland, meaning that under Britain's rules of conquest, laws in place at the time of acquisition remained in place until changed. Other than common law, there was no standard statutory law which applied for subjects throughout the realm, meaning different jurisdictions created their own legislation for local conditions, which often conflicted with the laws in other jurisdictions in the empire. Thus, a person who was naturalised in Canada, for example, would be considered a foreigner, rather than a British national, in Australia or South Africa. When British protectorates were established in 1815, there was little difference between the rights of British subjects and protected persons.

==== British subjects living in the Northern Rhodesia Protectorate (1914–1958) ====
In 1911, at the Imperial Conference a decision was made to draft a common nationality code for use across the empire. The British Nationality and Status of Aliens Act 1914 allowed local jurisdictions in the British self-governing territories to continue regulating nationality in their jurisdictions, but also established an imperial nationality scheme for use throughout the realm. Under its terms, common law provisions were reiterated for natural-born persons born within the realm on or after the effective date. By using the word person, the statute nullified legitimacy requirements for jus soli nationals, meaning an illegitimate child could derive nationality from its mother. For those born abroad on or after the effective date, legitimacy was still required, and nationality could only be derived by a child from a British father (one generation), who was natural-born or naturalised. It also provided that a married woman derived her nationality from her spouse, meaning if he was British, she was also, and if he was foreign, so was she. It stipulated that upon loss of nationality of a husband, a wife could declare that she wished to remain British. It allowed that if a marriage had terminated, through death or divorce, a British-born national who had lost her status through marriage could reacquire British nationality through naturalisation without meeting a residency requirement. The statute specified that a five-year residency or service to the crown was required for naturalisation.

Amendments to the British Nationality Act were enacted in 1918, 1922, 1933 and 1943 changing derivative nationality by descent and modifying slightly provisions for women to lose their nationality upon marriage. Because of a rise in statelessness, a woman who did not automatically acquire her husband's nationality upon marriage or upon his naturalisation in another country, did not lose her British status after 1933. The 1943 revision allowed a child born abroad at any time to be a British national by descent if the Secretary of State agreed to register the birth. Under the terms of the British Nationality Act 1948, British nationals in the Northern Rhodesia Protectorate were reclassified at that time as "Citizens of the UK and Colonies" (CUKC). The basic British nationality scheme did not change much, and typically those who were previously defined as British remained the same. Changes included that wives and children no longer automatically acquired the status of the husband or father, children who acquired nationality by descent no longer were required to make a retention declaration, and registrations for children born abroad were extended.

==== Indigenous persons (British Protected Persons) in the Northern Rhodesia Protectorate (1914–1958) ====
British protectorates, in 1914, were considered to be foreign territories lacking an internal government. When Britain extended this status over a territory, it took responsibility for both internal and external administration, including defense and foreign relations. Indigenous persons who were born in a protectorate were known as British Protected Persons and were not entitled to be British nationals. BPPs had no right of return to the United Kingdom and were unable to exercise rights of citizenship; however, they could be issued a passport and could access diplomatic services when traveling abroad. In 1914, the Alien Restriction Act clarified that while BPPs were not nationals, neither were they aliens. When the law was amended in 1919, that provision remained the same, meaning that BPPs could not naturalise. Until 1934, when the British Protected Persons Order was drafted, the status of BPP was not statutory, but rather granted at the prerogative of the monarch. Under the 1934 Order, Belonger status with regard to protected territories was defined to mean persons born before or after the Order in a protectorate who possessed no nationality and were not a British subject, or persons born abroad to a native of a protectorate who were stateless and not British subjects. The statute extended BPP status to children and wives of BPPs, if they were stateless, and specifically provided that if a woman married someone who was a national of another nation, she lost her BPP status.

In 1943, the British Nationality Act clarified that BPPs born abroad in territories that were within the Crown's dominions were British subjects by virtue of jus soli, but those born within a protectorate were not subjects. Under the terms of the British Nationality Act 1948, BPPs of the Northern Rhodesia Protectorate status did not change. However, the Act, while retaining the provisions that BPPs were not aliens and could not naturalise, allowed BPPs to register as BPP of a protected place or as a British subject under certain conditions. In 1949, the British Protectorates, Protected States and Protected Persons Order in Council repealed former orders about BPPs and detailed provisions for conferring protected status. It provided that protected persons were BPPs of a protectorate if they were born there; if they were born abroad to a father who was a native of a protectorate; or if at the time of their birth their father was a BPP. It also allowed women married to BPPs to register as a BPP and allowed certain nationals of foreign countries to register as BPPs. Minor changes to protected persons' status were made by Orders of Council in 1952, 1953, 1958, 1960, 1961, and 1962, but major changes did not occur until 1965.

=== Federation and return to protectorate status (1958–1964) ===
The Citizenship of Rhodesia and Nyassaland and British Nationality Act was drafted in 1957. Under its terms at independence, persons born prior to 1 March 1958 were reclassified as nationals of the Federation of Rhodesia and Nyassaland, if they had been born as British subjects, or acquired the status of a British subject by descent, registration, or naturalisation. Persons from the protectorates of Northern Rhodesia and Nyassaland could only acquire federation nationality if their father was a British subject. As a result, the majority of persons from the protectorates did not qualify for their status to change. In some instances, they could register as federation nationals. Those born in the federation after its union acquired nationality by being born in the territory of the federation. Under the terms of the British Nationality Act 1958, those who were nationals in the Federation of Rhodesia and Nyassaland were able to naturalise as British subjects. On 1 January 1964, the federation was dissolved. Persons who had acquired the nationality of the federation were either transferred to the status of a CUKC or national of Southern Rhodesia. Persons who had remained BPPs during the independence of the federation had no change in that status.

=== Post-independence (1964–present) ===
On 24 October 1964, Northern Rhodesia gained independence as the Republic of Zambia. Under the independence constitution, those who ceased to be British and became Zambian automatically on independence day were persons who had previously been BPPs and had been born in Northern Rhodesia, persons who had been born abroad but whose father acquired, or would have acquired had he not died, nationality at independence. Persons who had previously been registered or naturalised in Northern Rhodesia, including wives and widows of persons who had automatically become nationals or would have done so had they not died, were allowed to apply to be registered as nationals of Zambia. Those CUKCs and BPPs who did not become nationals of Zambia at independence, including the large Asian community who had been registered in Northern Rhodesia but not born there, retained their status as CUKCs or BPPs if they had been born, registered, or naturalised in a place, or were the wife of someone so described, which remained part of the United Kingdom and its colonies on 24 October 1964.

Those born after independence, acquired nationality by being born in the territory or aboard an aircraft or ship registered in Zambia or owned by the government, as long as their father was not an enemy alien or did not have diplomatic immunity. Children born abroad acquired nationality if their father was a Zambian national who had been born in Zambia. Those who were entitled to be registered included legal adoptees, wives of Zambians, persons who were Commonwealth citizens or nationals of the Republic of Ireland, persons who had been born in any African country who were ordinarily a resident in Zambia. (Note: Laurie Fransman, a leading expert on British nationality law, states that the provision for registration included "…a citizen of any country in Africa…", but Kelly Kapianga, who prepared a report for the European University Institute on Zambia says that the Minister of Home Affairs was required to provide a list of applicable African countries.) It also had provisions for registration of a person who reached twenty-one years old and one of their parents was Zambian, for example in the case that a child was born abroad to a father who had not been born in Zambia but was a national, or to a Zambian mother if the child would become stateless.

The constitution had provisions for a nationality law to be drafted and subsequently the 1964 Citizenship Act was passed. It affirmed the constitutional provisions and provided rules for naturalisation of persons who met qualifications, had resided in the country for at least five years, and intended to continue their residence. As dual nationality was forbidden, naturalisation required applicants to renounce other affiliations. It also contained provisions that persons could be denaturalised for obtaining another nationality; disloyalty; consorting with an enemy nation when Zambia was at war; residing abroad for seven or more years continuously without being in government service or employed in an international organisation or registering with the consulate; or having obtained nationality through fraud or concealing relevant facts.

In 1973 the independence constitution was repealed and a new constitution adopted, which altered the means of acquiring nationality from birth in Zambia to descent from a Zambian, but applied only to persons born after 25 August 1973. Under its terms, a child born anywhere to a father or mother who was Zambian automatically acquired Zambian nationality, as did a child whose father had been an ordinary resident in Zambia for at least four years immediately before the child was born. Those who acquired nationality from a father who was an ordinary resident had to apply to the Citizenship Board upon reaching majority to have their nationality confirmed and renounce any other nationality. Wives could acquire Zambian nationality through either registration after residing in Zambia for three years or through naturalisation if they were residents for a minimum of ten years. It allowed honorary nationality to be bestowed upon persons at the discretion of the President and allowed persons whose father had previously lost Zambian nationality because they held dual nationality to be registered on the condition that they renounced other nationality.

The constitution authorised creation of a new nationality law, which was created in 1975 and went into force on 4 March 1977. It preserved the nationality of those who had previously acquired nationality under earlier acts. It created a Citizenship Board to take over administration of naturalisation processes, relieving the Ministry of Home Affairs from most matters relating to naturalisation. Under its terms the constitutional provisions were reiterated and residency requirements were lengthened from five years to ten years. Zambian women who automatically acquired a foreign nationality upon marriage to a foreigner were exempt from losing their Zambian nationality under the 1975 Act, but new grounds for denaturalisation included smuggling currency, or harbouring an illegal immigrant or criminal. Ordinary residence was clarified to not include any period of living in the country when one was residing there under a temporary immigration permit, which created confusion as it was unclear if only those who were not legal residents were qualified to apply for nationality. Amendments were made to the 1975 Citizenship Act in 1986 to clarify that this provision meant only those with right to reside who had a valid entry permit could apply. Other changes made in 1986 were removal of the right to acquire nationality through established residents and for children of denaturalised dual nationals to register as nationals. An amendment enacted in 1990 to the Citizenship Act allowed children who were born with dual nationality to retain both affiliations.

In 1991, a new constitution was adopted which retained the prior schemes for acquiring nationality, but repeated the confusing language from the 1973 Constitution regarding whether living in the country under a permit was or was not valid in determining length of residency. Though it authorised enactment of a new nationality law, none was promulgated, and the 1975 Citizenship Act, as amended remained in force. The constitution was amended in 1996, but made no changes to the requirements for gaining or losing nationality, other than removing the right to register as a national based upon marriage. No changes were made to the nationality law until 2016. That year, a new constitution and the Citizenship of Zambia (Act No. 33) were passed, stipulating retention of nationality for those who had acquired it under previous laws.

Under the terms of the constitution, presidential discretion for determining eligibility for nationality was curtailed. For those who automatically acquire nationality at birth, the constitution stipulates that they acquire it by birth or by descent, but no such distinction exists in the Citizenship Act. Both categories require that the parents be Zambian. For the first time, the constitution provided that children under the age of eight, who have no discernible nationality and whose parents are unknown, found in Zambia acquire Zambian nationality. It also stipulated as previous constitutions had not the right for legal adoptees to acquire Zambian nationality. Though prior nationality laws had allowed nationality to be derived upon completion of a legal adoption, they contained language that nationality had to follow the father's nationality. This gender-discriminatory language was removed from the 2016 constitution, allowing adoptees to acquire nationality from either parent. It allowed persons to register who had been married to a Zambian national for at least five years without proving residency. It also allowed registration for persons who had been born in Zambia or who were born abroad but descend from a Zambian national, after having resided in Zambia for five years, or for other residents after a ten-year permitted residency. New provisions allowed for dual nationality and the option of repatriating if a person had previously been denaturalised for having other nationality. Grounds for being denaturalised under the 2016 Constitution are limited to having committed fraud in obtaining nationality. The Citizenship Act adopted that year, reaffirmed these provisions and added a provision that persons who renounced their nationality and who had not acquired another one within six months would automatically be restored as Zambian to prevent statelessness.
