= Seychellois nationality law =

Seychelles Citizenship Act

Seychellois National Assembly
- Long title: Seychelles Citizenship Act No. 18 of 1994 (as amended by Act No. 11 of 2013)
- Enacted by: Government of Seychelles
- Status: Current legislation

Seychellois nationality law is regulated by the Constitution of Seychelles, as amended; the Citizenship Act, and its revisions; and various international agreements to which the country is a signatory. These laws determine who is, or is eligible to be, a national of Seychelles. The legal means to acquire nationality, formal legal membership in a nation, differ from the domestic relationship of rights and obligations between a national and the nation, known as citizenship. Nationality describes the relationship of an individual to the state under international law, whereas citizenship is the domestic relationship of an individual within the nation.

In Britain and thus the Commonwealth of Nations, though the terms are often used synonymously outside of law, they are governed by different statutes and regulated by different authorities. Seychellois nationality is typically obtained under the principal of jus sanguinis, i.e. by birth in Seychelles or abroad to parents with Seychellois nationality. It can be granted to persons with an affiliation to the country, or to a permanent resident who has lived in the country for a given period of time through naturalisation or registration.

== Acquisition of nationality ==
Nationality can be acquired in the Seychelles at birth or later in life through naturalisation or registration. Naturalisation typically applies to a spouse or a child who is processed with a parent's application; whereas, registration is required for people whose parents were born in Seychelles, or those with special skill or circumstances including investors, students and skilled prioritized workers.

=== By birth ===
Children born in the Seychelles to at least one parent who is Seychellois acquire nationality at birth.

=== By naturalisation ===
Naturalisation can be granted to persons who have resided in the territory for a sufficient period of time to confirm they understand the customs and traditions of Seychelles and are integrated into the society. General provisions are that applicants must pass a citizenship test with 80 per cent accuracy and that have no criminal convictions resulting in a sentence of one year or more. Applicants must typically have resided in the country for fifteen years. Besides foreigners meeting the criteria, other persons who may be naturalised include:

- Children legally adopted by a Seychellois parent, at the time of completion of a legal adoption automatically derive Seychellois nationality;
- Minor children can be included in their parent's naturalisation petition;
- The legal spouse of a Seychellois national after ten years of marriage and a five-year residency;

=== By registration ===
Persons who do not typically meet the requirements for naturalisation may be registered under special circumstances if they have passed a citizenship test with 80 per cent accuracy and that have no criminal convictions resulting in a sentence of one year or more. They must have been a legal resident for a period of at least fifteen years or permanent resident for ten years and have been physically present in the country for a minimum of thirteen years, without being continuously absent for a period of one year. Registration under these special circumstances is at the discretion of the President of Seychelles. Those who qualify are:

- Children born abroad to at least one parent who is Seychellois, after completing and administrative registration process and being resident in Seychelles for at least two years;
- Persons who have lived and completed secondary education in Seychelles, who have returned to work in Seychelles after graduating from university abroad, or who have been a permanent resident in the country for five years; or
- Persons who have performed distinguished or meritorious service to the nation may be allowed to gain nationality at the discretion of the President of Seychelles without meeting conditions.
- Persons who have an exceptional ability in the arts, business, economics, education, law, science, or sport;
- Persons who hold a degree which allows them to significantly contribute to development in Seychelles;
- Persons who have made substantial contributions to the nation;
- Persons who were married to a Seychellois and had children or who had no children but the spouse has deceased; or
- Persons who have invested a minimum of $1,000,000 US in a business in Seychelles, have the ability to be self-sufficient, and have resided in the country for a minimum of eleven years.

== Loss of nationality ==
Seychellois nationals can renounce their nationality pending approval by the state. Seychellois of origin may not lose their nationality. Naturalised persons may be denaturalised in Seychelles for disloyalty to the state; for committing crimes, such as drugs offences, piracy, terrorism or treason, against the state or state security; for ordinary serious crimes; or for fraud, false representation, or concealment in a naturalisation application. Persons who previously had nationality and renounced it for socio-economic reasons may repatriate after re-establishing residency and passing both the citizenship test with 80 percent accuracy and a background check confirming no imprisonments of more than one year.

== Dual nationality ==
Since 1993, Seychelles has allowed nationals to hold dual nationality as long as their dual status is recorded with the government.

== Commonwealth citizenship ==
Seychellois citizens are also Commonwealth citizens by default.

== History ==
Arabic manuscripts written in the ninth and tenth centuries describe the Rukh Islands, which are believed to denote the Seychelles. In 1502, the Portuguese navigator Vasco da Gama sighted the islands naming the largest island group in the archipelago the Seven Sisters and the Amirante Islands (Ilhas do Almirante) to commemorate his second voyage to India. For several decades Portuguese navigators explored the islands and in 1598 established a settlement, though it failed. British explorers scouted the islands in 1609 and a French expedition was launched by Lazare Picault from Île de France (now Mauritius) in 1742 to map the islands. The cartographers named the islands as Îles de la Bourdonnais, after the Mauritian governor Bertrand-François Mahé de La Bourdonnais. Picault led a second voyage to explore the islands in 1744. In 1756, Corneille Nicholas Morphey, under orders from the French East India Company claimed the islands on behalf of the company and the king, naming them the Îles de la Séchelles in honour of Viscount Jean Moreau de Séchelles, Comptroller of the Finance during the reign of Louis XV. Other than transient sailors, shipwrecked crew, or pirates, when the French claimed the islands in 1756, they were not permanently inhabited.

=== French period (1756–1814) ===
In 1768, Marc-Joseph Marion du Fresne sailed to Praslin Island to scout for timber and took possession of the island. He named the Curieuse and La Digue Islands off the coast of Praslin after his ships. From 1769, Pierre Poivre led numerous failed attempts to establish colonies in the islands. In 1770, Henri Charles François Brayer du Barré organised fifty persons, including both black and white colonists, from the Île de Bourbon to establish the first settlement on Ste. Anne Island. Though they struggled with lack of supplies and famine, the colony managed to survive and in 1775, sued Brayer du Barré for mismanaging the colony. In 1771, a planter named Antoine Nicolas Benoît Gillot established the first settlement on Mahé. Pierre Hanguard a Norman and former soldier of the French East India Company had obtained a land concession on Mahé around the same time as Gillot. Becoming a rival of Brayer du Barré, he later moved to Ste. Anne and took over the colony.

The Ancien Régime of France developed a system of feudal allegiance in which subjects were bound together by a scheme of protection and service tied to land ownership. Possession of land was typically tied to military and court service and omitted women because they could not perform those obligations. Thus, French nationality also derived from place of birth in French territory, until the nineteenth century, but under feudal law married women were subjugated to the authority of their husbands under coverture. Though attempts were made to codify the common law of the colonies in 1716, 1738, 1758, and between 1761 and 1768, none were successful. Having separate codes for the colonies and metropole was a characteristic of the empire and created little unity and standardisation in French law. Thus, the French Constitution of 1791, which gave legitimacy to the French Revolution and human rights protections by incorporating the Declaration of the Rights of Man and of the Citizen, did not include any of the colonies or possessions of France in Africa, Asia, or the Americas.

The abolition of slavery in 1794 granted French nationality to all men in the French colonies, but the reestablishment of slavery in 1802, made the status of colonial subjects confusing. The 1802 coup d'état of Napoleon Bonaparte rolled back gains made during the French Revolutionary period, re-establishing the law and customs in effect before the Revolution of 1789. In 1805, the Napoleonic Code, the French Civil Code, was implemented in France, the French Antilles, and French Guiana. The provisions contained in it applied only to the white French residing in the colonies. Under the Civil Code, women were legally incapacitated and paternal authority was established over children. Upon marriage, a woman automatically acquired the same nationality as her spouse. Illegitimate children were barred from inheritance and nationality could only be transmitted through a father. Conflicts between France and Britain which began in 1803, extended to their colonies. Britain made plans to capture the Mascarene Islands, taking Rodrigues Island in 1809, Île de Bourbon in July 1810, and on 3 December 1810, accepted the surrender for the Île de France. Under the terms of the capitulation, French custom, language, laws, property and religion were to remain in force. In April 1811, Captain Philip Beaver arrived in Seychelles and claimed the islands for Britain as a prize of war.

=== British colony (1814–1976) ===
Seychelles was formally acquired by Britain in 1814 under the terms of the Treaty of Paris and was made a dependency of British Mauritius. In August 1903, Letters Patent were issued making the territory a separate Crown Colony. In Britain, allegiance, in which subjects pledged to support a monarch, was the precursor to the modern concept of nationality. The crown recognised from 1350 that all persons born within the territories of the British Empire were subjects. Those born outside the realm — except children of those serving in an official post abroad, children of the monarch, and children born on a British sailing vessel — were considered by common law to be foreigners. Marriage did not affect the status of a subject of the realm, except that under common law, single women, including divorcées, were not allowed to be parents thus their children could not derive nationality maternally and were stateless unless legitimated by their father. Nationality laws passed by the British Parliament were extended only to the Kingdom of Great Britain, and later the United Kingdom of Great Britain and Ireland.

In 1911, at the Imperial Conference a decision was made to draft a common nationality code for use across the empire. The British Nationality and Status of Aliens Act 1914 allowed local jurisdictions in the self-governing Dominions to continue regulating nationality in their territories, but also established an imperial nationality scheme throughout the realm. The uniform law, which went into effect on 1 January 1915, required a married woman to derive her nationality from her spouse, meaning if he was British, she was also, and if he was foreign, so was she. It stipulated that upon loss of nationality of a husband, a wife could declare that she wished to remain British and provided that if a marriage had terminated, through death or divorce, a British-born national who had lost her status through marriage could reacquire British nationality through naturalisation without meeting a residency requirement. The statute reiterated common law provisions for natural-born persons born within the realm on or after the effective date. By using the word person, the statute nullified legitimacy requirements for jus soli nationals. For those born abroad on or after the effective date, legitimacy was still required, and could only be derived by a child from a British father (one generation), who was natural-born or naturalised. Naturalisations required five years residence or service to the crown.

Amendments to the British Nationality Act were enacted in 1918, 1922, 1933 and 1943 changing derivative nationality by descent and modifying slightly provisions for women to lose their nationality upon marriage. Because of a rise in statelessness, a woman who did not automatically acquire her husband's nationality upon marriage or upon his naturalisation in another country, did not lose their British status after 1933. The 1943 revision allowed a child born abroad at any time to be a British national by descent if the Secretary of State agreed to register the birth. Under the terms of the British Nationality Act 1948 British nationals in Seychelles were reclassified at that time as "Citizens of the UK and Colonies" (CUKC). The basic British nationality scheme did not change overmuch, and typically those who were previously defined as British remained the same. Changes included that wives and children no longer automatically acquired the status of the husband or father, children who acquired nationality by descent no longer were required to make a retention declaration, and registrations for children born abroad were extended. In the wake of African independence movements, during the 1950d and 1960s, political parties and trade unions rapidly expanded. Hoping to maintain a presence in the area and recognizing the inevitability of independence, in 1965, Britain detached Aldabra Group of islands, Desroches Island, and the Farquhar Islands from Seychelles, officially making them part of the British Indian Ocean Territory. In 1970, a constitutional conference was held in London to chart the path for independence. The territories removed from Seychelles in 1965 were returned on 28 June 1976, prior to independence.

=== Post-independence (1976–present) ===
Seychelles gained its independence on 29 June 1976. At independence, blanket nationality was conferred on CUKCs who had been born, registered, or naturalised in Seychelles prior to independence. Upon becoming Seychellois, they lost their British nationality. Persons who were born to a father or married to a husband who would have become Seychellois except for their death were also conferred nationality. Persons born abroad to a father who was conferred nationality or would have been conferred nationality if he had not died also became nationals at independence. Any person who qualified for nationality but had not yet obtained that status, was allowed to register during a transitional period until 29 June 1977. Those persons who did not qualify for Seychellois nationality but were born, registered, or naturalised in other parts of the British Empire did not lose their British nationality. Under the terms of the Independence Constitution, anyone born after independence in Seychelles could acquire nationality at birth, as long as the father did not have diplomatic immunity and was not an enemy alien.

Subsequently, the Citizenship of Seychelles Act (No. 9 of 1976) was passed to make further provisions for nationality. It allowed only legitimate children born in Seychelles whose parents were Seychellois to acquire nationality at birth. Children born abroad could acquire nationality at birth if their father was Seychellois and had been born in Seychelles. Illegitimate children were allowed to obtain nationality through their mother if the father was unknown or stateless. The wife of a Seychellois could upon marriage could apply to become naturalised without meeting other requirements. Naturalisation could be obtained by persons who renounced other nationality, had continuous residence of at least five years, were knowledgeable in English or French, and intended to remain in Seychelles. Dual nationality was only allowed in the case that someone obtained another nationality for economic or domestic reasons, of that they involuntarily acquired other nationality upon marriage.

In 1979, the Constitution was changed to proclaim a change for the country to a Socialist state. Changes to the nationality scheme were that children born in Seychelles after its effective date could derive nationality from either parent and children born abroad could derive nationality if one or both of their parents were Seychellois or at least one of their grandparents had been born in Seychelles. The constitution left a gap in the provisions for Seychellois born abroad, making no provisions for those born between 1976 and 1979 to acquire nationality from their mothers. It also allowed either spouse to acquire nationality at marriage, as soon as they took up residence in Seychelles. After the dissolution of the Soviet Union, in 1992, Seychelles amended its constitution to allow a multi-party state and adopted a new constitution in 1993. Under the terms of the constitution, those who had previously been nationals under earlier constitutions continued to be so and nationality could be acquired through birth, naturalisation, or registration. Persons born in Seychelles to at least one parent who was Seychellois, as long as the parent was not a foreign diplomat or enemy alien acquired nationality at birth. Spouses of Seychellois nationals were allowed to naturalise without renouncing other nationality as were children born abroad between 1976 and 1979 to a Seychellois mother. It provided automatic nationality for children upon completion of adoption, as well as upon request for children of naturalized Seychellois.

The Citizenship Act 1994 (No. 18 of 1994) reiterated constitutional provisions and repealed the 1976 Citizenship Act. It changed the basis of nationality at birth from jus soli, birth in the territory, to a descent-based method for attaining nationality. Removal of jus soli provisions resulted in a 2020 Universal Periodic Review by the Office of the United Nations High Commissioner for Human Rights to note that there are no provisions for foundlings or stateless children born in the country to acquire nationality, which is required under the African Charter on the Rights and Welfare of the Child to which Seychelles is a signatory. It established rules for the conferment of nationality through birth, naturalisation, and registration, and detailed requirements for acquisition based upon persons with special circumstances. It also specified procedures for renunciation and denaturalisation, as well as repatriation. An amendment to the Citizenship Act in 2013 (Act 11 of 2013), allowed persons to be granted nationality based on investment. The amendment also expanded the reasons for deprivation of nationality to include acts of terrorism, drug trafficking, and piracy, among other serious offences.

A proposal was made in 2019, to correct the issue in the nationality statutes of women who lost their nationality by marrying a foreigner whose country would not allow her to keep her Seychellois nationality. The process was to begin with a public education and consultation phase. In September 2021, the proposed amendment to the Citizenship Act was approved by the Cabinet and submitted for review and a vote by the National Assembly. The draft called for the duration of marriage to increase to fifteen years, but the residency requirement of five years would remain unchanged. It also carries a proposal to remove registration for all persons, including investors, student or workers who are not former Seychellois. Given that registration under the draft would only apply to former Seychellois, no citizenship test would be required if it is approved. To address the issue which per previous legislation did not allow children born between 1976 and 1979 to acquire nationality from their mothers except through naturalisation, the proposed law would confer nationality upon them.
