= Vincentian nationality law =

Vincentian nationality law is regulated by the Saint Vincent Constitution Order of 1979, as amended; the Saint Vincent and the Grenadines Citizenship Act of 1984, and its revisions; and various British Nationality laws. These laws determine who is, or is eligible to be, a national of Saint Vincent and the Grenadines. Vincentian nationality is typically obtained either on the principle of jus soli, i.e. by birth in Saint Vincent and the Grenadines; or under the rules of jus sanguinis, i.e. by birth abroad to parents with Vincentian nationality. It can be granted to persons with an affiliation to the country, or to a permanent resident who has lived in the country for a given period of time through naturalisation. There is not currently a program in Saint Vincent and the Grenadines for persons to acquire nationality through investment in the country. Nationality establishes one's international identity as a member of a sovereign nation. Though it is not synonymous with citizenship, for rights granted under domestic law for domestic purposes, the United Kingdom, and thus the commonwealth, have traditionally used the words interchangeably.

== Acquiring Vincentian nationality ==
Vincentian nationality is acquired through birth, registration, or naturalisation.

=== By birth ===
- Persons who are born within the territory, except if the parent has diplomatic immunity or is a national of a country at war with Saint Vincent and the Grenadines;
- Persons who are born abroad to at least one parent who was born in Saint Vincent and the Grenadines; or
- Persons born upon aircraft or ships registered in Saint Vincent and the Grenadines or unregistered aircraft or ships belonging to the government.

=== By registration ===
Nationality by registration includes those who have familial or historic relationship affiliations with Saint Vincent and the Grenadines. Persons who acquire nationality by registration include:

- The spouse of a national of Saint Vincent and the Grenadines;
- Commonwealth citizens, who are ordinary residents of Saint Vincent and the Grenadines and who have resided in the territory for seven years;
- Minor persons who were born to a Vincentian parent who would have acquired such nationality had their parent not died prior to independence;
- Minors under age twenty-one who are legally adopted by or the step-child of a national; or
- Any minor, at the discretion of the Minister.

=== By naturalisation ===
Ordinary naturalisation in Saint Vincent and the Grenadines can be obtained by adult persons of legal capacity, who in the 12 months prior to submitting an application resided in the territory, are of good character, and intend to be a resident of Saint Vincent and the Grenadines. Applicants petition the Minister responsible for immigration, who considers whether the applicant has adequate knowledge of the English language; and has resided within the territory, worked for the government, or has combined residency and government service for nine years. Upon approval, applicants must take an Oath of Allegiance and may be required to renounce their citizenship of origin.

== Loss of nationality ==
Nationals may voluntarily renounce their affiliation with Saint Vincent and the Grenadines, if the declarant is a legal adult and of full capacity. Renunciation may not be accepted if Saint Vincent and the Grenadines is in a war with the proposed new source of nationality. Denaturalisation may occur if a person obtained nationality through fraud, false representation, or concealment; if they have committed acts of treason; if they have committed acts of disloyalty or service to a foreign government; and if they have continuously resided abroad for a period of five years.

== Dual nationality ==
Vincentians have been allowed to have dual nationality from the time of independence.

== History ==
=== Kalinago, African, and French period (1493–1783) ===
The Kalinago people, also known as Island Caribs, who originated in The Guianas, arrived on Saint Vincent around 1200 AD, and exterminated the native Arawak people. By virtue of a papal bull issued by Pope Alexander VI in 1493 to settle boundary disputes between Spain and Portugal, Spain acquired the right to claim all lands between the north and south poles lying 100 sea miles west of the Azores or the Cape Verde islands. Though some histories have reported that Christopher Columbus landed on Saint Vincent on 22 January 1498, current scholarship indicates that he was in Spain at that time. Which European nation may have first identified Saint Vincent is unknown, but the resistance by the Kalinago people to Spanish settlement prevented the Spaniards from attempting to settle in the Lesser Antilles. From 1596, British sailors reported that the inhabitants of the islands included Kalinago people and Africans. Africans on the island came as captives of the Kalinago people from raids on neighboring islands; as runaways from nearby Saint Lucia and Barbados; or as survivors of shipwrecks in the nearby waters. (Note: Various tales of shipwrecks, indicate that the first Africans arrived in 1734, 1712, 1675, or 1635 aboard slave ships that might have been British, Dutch, Portuguese or Spanish. In 1748, Tourouya (also known as Touriac), a leader of the Black Caribs on Saint Vincent advised Charles de Tubières de Caylus, the French Governor of Martinique, that the ship they had been on was Spanish. Regardless of the date of a shipwreck, the Kalinago people had raided English and Spanish settlements from the mid-1500s taking captives.) Intermarriage between the Kalinago people and Africans produced a group of mixed ancestry, which came to be known as the Black Carib people.

In 1626, the Compagnie de Saint-Christophe was chartered by Louis XIII's chief minister, Cardinal Richelieu to colonise the Lesser Antilles, between the eleventh and eighteenth parallels. In 1627 a royal patent was issued by Charles I of England to James Hay, 1st Earl of Carlisle granting rights over the Caribbean islands situated between 10° and 20° north latitude, creating a competing claim. Attempts by both the British and French to colonise Saint Vincent during this period were unsuccessful because of the resistance of the Kalinago people. In 1635, the Compagnie de Saint-Christophe was reorganised under a new patent for the Compagnie des Îles de l'Amérique, granting the new company all the properties and administration of its predecessor, as well as the rights to continue colonising neighbouring vacant islands. By 1650, the Company was facing bankruptcy and Jacques Dyel du Parquet, Governor of Martinique, sailed to France and in September purchased the sole proprietorship for Grenada, the Grenadines, Martinique and Sainte-Lucie for 41,500 Francs. In 1654, du Parquet sent an expedition to attack the Kalinago people on Saint Vincent. The Africans and indigenous groups combined forces to repel the French. In March 1660 Kalinago representatives met with English and French representatives in Guadeloupe to negotiate a peace. The agreement signed allowed Dominica and Saint Vincent to remain Kalinago territory and prohibited settlement on those islands by the English or French except the missionaries who were already there. In return the Kalinago people agreed to stop their raids against English and French colonies on other islands.

In 1661 proprietary rule was ended by Louis XIV upon his individual rise to the throne. To take advantage of trading opportunities, in 1664, he created the French West India Company, granting them a trading monopoly in the French Antilles. A decade later, he dissolved the company and incorporated all of the French possessions in the Americas into crown colonies. In 1668, in response to the Kalinago's support of the Dutch in the Anglo-Dutch War (1665–1667) and increasing French influence among them, Lord Francis Willoughby of Parham, administrator of Britain's holdings in the Lesser Antilles, sent troops to Saint Vincent. After capturing several Kalinago men, he forced them to sign a treaty of friendship and support with Britain and agree to return British captives. In 1686, the Lieutenant-Governor of Barbados, Edwin Stede, sent John Temple to Saint Vincent with orders to make clear the British claim to the island and order the removal of foreigners. Though repelled by the Kalinago, the British burned homes and food stores on the island. British attempts at persuading the Kalinago people by force were far less effective than the diplomacy of the French in gaining alliances with the native inhabitants of Saint Vincent.

As more Africans arrived on the island, their numbers eventually exceeded those of the Kalinago people and conflicts arose. In 1700, an agreement, brokered by the Governor of Martinique, was reached for the Black Caribs to live on the eastern coast and the Kalinago people to live in the west. Despite the agreement of 1660, French subjects began to expand into Kalinago territory again. An attempt made in 1721, to persuade these adventurers to abandon their farms to take up land grants in Grenada, Guadeloupe, or Martinique proved ineffective in getting settlers to return to France's imperial lands. Two years later, a British expedition, led by John Braithwaite, attempted to gain permission from the Kalinago to establish a settlement. Though he offered gifts, they remained resolute refusing to allow the British to colonize. By 1732, a census designed to determine the extent of Europeans on the island enumerated 284 white inhabitants, 103 free people of colour, and 854 slaves residing in Saint Vincent. As the population of French settlers continued to grow in supposedly neutral territory, by 1750, British officials began to complain and press for colonists to be evacuated. Imperial administrators on both sides negotiated throughout the first half of the 1750s, but in 1756 with the outbreak of the Seven Years' War the agreement reached in 1660 began to unravel. In March 1762, British troops attacked Saint Vincent, gaining control of the island, which was formally ceded to Britain under the terms of the Treaty of Paris in 1763, without consultation with the Kalinago people or consideration of the 1660 agreement with them. At the time of the treaty, the population on Saint Vincent indicated there were 1,300 free inhabitants, 3,430 slaves, and 1,138 Kalinago people, though the estimate of the native population is questionable. (Note: When the Kalinago people were forcibly removed in 1797, they numbered around 5,000.)

In 1764, British administrators arrived on Saint Vincent and implemented a land distribution program. Over the next three years, they gave patents to 12,507 acres on the western side of the island, but none in the territory controlled by the Black Caribs. In 1769, an expedition was sent to survey the lands occupied by the Black Caribs, but Joseph Chatoyer, one of their leaders, refused to allow the British encroachment. Ignoring them, British surveyors began to work on building a road and were captured by a group of Black Caribs, who informed the British they would release them upon agreement to give up interference in native territory. Though they agreed to the terms, the British had no intention of allowing the Black Caribs to retain their territory. A military assault ensued and the two sides reached a stalemate, with neither gaining ground. The conflict was finally concluded in 1773 by an agreement for the Black Caribs to cede a portion of their land to Britain and allow roads to be built in exchange for retaining the remainder of their territory. Neither side was pleased with the outcome and the Black Caribs used their relationship with the French to attempt to oust the British when hostilities emerged during the American Revolutionary War. The French and Black Caribs took over the island in 1779 and held it until 1783, when the Treaty of Versailles returned Saint Vincent to the British.

=== British colonial period (1783–1979) ===
The local administrators lobbied for the removal of the Black Caribs because of their breach of allegiance to the British in siding with the French, but the crown refused to take punitive measures. In Britain, allegiance, in which subjects pledged to support a monarch, was the precursor to the modern concept of nationality. The crown recognised from 1350 that all persons born within the territories of the British Empire were subjects. Those born outside the realm — except children of those serving in an official post abroad, children of the monarch, and children born on a British sailing vessel — were considered by common law to be foreigners. Marriage did not affect the status of a subject of the realm. Governor Edmund Lincoln implemented a policy for the Black Caribs to take an oath of allegiance and then worked at severing their ties with the French on the nearby islands, resulting in a peaceful coexistence prevailing through the first part of the 1790s. In 1794, a series of slave revolts in Guadeloupe, Grenada, and Saint Lucia against British rule, led by Victor Hugues, prompted the Black Caribs to launch war against the British in March 1795. Backed by the French, conflict continued for two years and ended only after the French surrendered and the British destroyed food supplies, leading to widespread starvation. Between 4,338 and 4,776 Black Caribs were deported to Baliceaux, where many died from disease. (Note: The nature of the disease is unknown. It may have been typhus, spread by the unhygienic conditions, or it may have been yellow fever.) In March 1797, the survivors, numbering 2,248, were exiled to Roatán Island off the coast of Honduras, and became the ancestors of the Garifuna people.

For eight years, Black Caribs who had survived the war and hid in the forest continued to surface and occasionally had violent encounters with settlers. They were eventually pardoned by the local legislature in 1805 and the former territory they occupied was converted into sugar cultivation. Unlike other colonial powers with slave societies in the Caribbean, the British did not have a single overarching slave code. Each British colony was allowed to establish its own rules about the slave trade, and a code was created for Saint Vincent in 1767. There was a clear social hierarchy which developed with white British planters at the top, separated from the French and locals with lower socio-economic status, followed by free coloured persons, and slaves. Married women were subjugated to the authority of their husbands under coverture, and the law was structured to maintain social hierarchies by regulating familial matters like, who could marry, legitimacy, and inheritance. Children in slave societies followed the status of the mother, thus if she was free her children would be free or if she was in bondage, her children would also be bound.

Other than common law, there was no standard statutory law which applied for subjects throughout the realm, meaning different jurisdictions created their own legislation for local conditions, which often conflicted with the laws in other jurisdictions in the empire. Nationality laws passed by the British Parliament were extended only to the Kingdom of Great Britain, and later the United Kingdom of Great Britain and Ireland. In 1807, the British Parliament passed the Slave Trade Act, barring the Atlantic slave trade in the empire. The Act did not abolish slavery, which did not end until the 1833 Emancipation Act went into effect in 1834. Under its terms, slaves were converted into apprentices and remained bound to their former owners for four years if they had worked in the home and for six years if they had been field labourers. The apprenticeship program was abandoned in 1838, as officials feared problems would result from freeing only a portion of the former slaves. Though free, there was never a British plan to give former slaves a voice in Parliament, leaving them as British subjects in a highly stratified system of rights. Denied political and economic rights, former slaves were not entitled to formal recognition as nationals by other nations.

In 1833, Saint Vincent, along with Barbados, Grenada, and Tobago were joined in the British Windward Islands colony, though each territory had its own Legislative Assembly. Saint Lucia was added to the colony in 1838, though it was a crown colony and was administered through the British government. In 1876, both Grenada and Saint Vincent suspended their representative governments and became crown colonies. In 1885, Barbados withdrew from the Windward Colony and the governorship was moved to St. George's, Grenada. In 1911, at the Imperial Conference a decision was made to draft a common nationality code for use across the empire. The British Nationality and Status of Aliens Act 1914 allowed local jurisdictions in the self-governing Dominions to continue regulating nationality in their territories, but also established an imperial nationality scheme throughout the realm. The uniform law, which went into effect on 1 January 1915, required a married woman to derive her nationality from her spouse, meaning if he was British, she was also, and if he was foreign, so was she. It stipulated that upon loss of nationality of a husband, a wife could declare that she wished to remain British and provided that if a marriage had terminated, through death or divorce, a British-born national who had lost her status through marriage could reacquire British nationality through naturalisation without meeting a residency requirement. The statute reiterated common law provisions for natural-born persons born within the realm on or after the effective date. By using the word person, the statute nullified legitimacy requirements for jus soli nationals. For those born abroad on or after the effective date, legitimacy was still required, and could only be derived by a child from a British father (one generation), who was natural-born or naturalised. Naturalisations required five years residence or service to the crown.

Amendments to the British Nationality Act were enacted in 1918, 1922, 1933 and 1943 changing derivative nationality by descent and modifying slightly provisions for women to lose their nationality upon marriage. Because of a rise in statelessness, a woman who did not automatically acquire her husband's nationality upon marriage or upon his naturalisation in another country, did not lose their British status after 1933. The 1943 revision allowed a child born abroad at any time to be a British national by descent if the Secretary of State agreed to register the birth. Under the terms of the British Nationality Act 1948 British nationals in Saint Vincent were reclassified at that time as "Citizens of the UK and Colonies" (CUKC). The basic British nationality scheme did not change overmuch, and typically those who were previously defined as British remained the same. Changes included that wives and children no longer automatically acquired the status of the husband or father, children who acquired nationality by descent no longer were required to make a retention declaration, and registrations for children born abroad were extended.

In 1958, Saint Vincent joined the West Indies Federation. The federation, which included Barbados, the British Leeward Islands, the British Windward Islands, Jamaica, and Trinidad and Tobago, was typically seen by its supporters as a means to use a federal structure to gain national independence and eventual recognition as a Dominion. The federation was unable to develop a unified nationality scheme, as member states tended to identify with their specific island, rather than by region. The federation collapsed in 1962, but in 1967, Saint Vincent became an Associated State, under the West Indies Act of that year. The terms of the Act provided that Associated States – Antigua, Dominica, Grenada, Saint Christopher-Nevis-Anguilla, Saint Lucia, and Saint Vincent – were on a trajectory to become fully independent and could terminate their association upon becoming an independent Commonwealth country. Saint Vincent terminated Associated State status and became fully independent in 1979.

=== Post-independence (1979–present) ===
Saint Vincent gained independence on 27 October 1979 and amended its name to Saint Vincent and the Grenadines. Generally, persons who had previously been nationals as defined under the classification of "Citizens of the UK and Colonies", would become nationals of Saint Vincent and the Grenadines on Independence Day and cease to be British nationals. In addition, the law granted children the right to derive nationality from either parent and made women who had formerly been registered as CUKCs of Saint Vincent, nationals in their own right. Exceptions were made for persons to retain their British nationality and status if they (or their father or grandfather) were born, naturalised, or registered in a part of the realm which remained on 1 November part of the United Kingdom or colonies, or had been annexed by such a place. Another exception provided that women did not lose their CUKC status, unless their husband did. Rather than granting married women the right to register, or widows who but for the death of the husband would have been eligible to register, Saint Vincent and the Grenadines granted women nationality in their own right at independence and allowed CUKCs with a maternal connection to derive nationality from their mothers. The country also granted nationality on independence day to persons who were Commonwealth citizens, who had ordinarily lived in the territory for a minimum of seven years before independence, and allowed husbands to register as citizens based on their wife's nationality. Subsequent to independence, the territory enacted the Saint Vincent and the Grenadines Citizenship Act in 1984.
