= Turkmenistani nationality law =

Turkmenistani Citizenship Act

Assembly of Turkmenistan
- Long title: An Act relating to Turkmenistani citizenship
- Enacted by: Government of Turkmenistan
- Status: Current legislation

Turkmenistani nationality law is contained in the provisions of the law of Turkmenistan on citizenship and in the relevant provisions of the Turkmenistan Constitution. A person may be a citizen of Turkmenistan through birth, restoration or through naturalisation.

== Acquisition of citizenship ==
=== At birth ===
A child, both of whose parents have Turkmenistani citizenship at the time of its birth, is a citizen of Turkmenistan, regardless of whether it was born on the territory of Turkmenistan or outside it.

There are two more provisions in this act which result in children being citizens of Turkmenistan at birth through the following ways:

- A child born in the territory of Turkmenistan to individuals without citizenship who reside permanently on the territory of Turkmenistan is a citizen of Turkmenistan.
- A child located in the territory of Turkmenistan, both of whose parents are unknown is regarded as having been born there and is considered a citizen of Turkmenistan. In the event of the discovery of even one of its parents, a guardian, or a trustee, the child's citizenship may change according to the present law.

=== By restoration ===
A person who wishes to restore their Turkmenistani citizenship must do so by petitioning the Turkmenistan government. The person should be residing in the territory of Turkmenistan or intends to settle there permanently.

=== By naturalisation ===
A person who has had permanent residence of Turkmenistan for the past seven years can apply for naturalisation if they fulfil the following conditions:

- If they make a commitment to obey and respect the Constitution and laws of Turkmenistan.
- If they know the state language of Turkmenistan sufficiently well to communicate.
- If they have a legitimate source of livelihood on the territory of Turkmenistan.

An application for naturalisation may be denied if the petitioning individual:

- Has committed a crime against humanity specified by international law or has committed genocide.
- Has been sentenced to punishment in the form of incarceration for a serious premeditated criminal act.
- Deliberately works against the independence of Turkmenistan.

== Loss of citizenship ==
=== Voluntary ===
A person who wishes to renounce their Turkmenistani citizenship must do so by petitioning the Turkmenistan government.

Renunciation of Turkmenistani citizenship is not allowed if the individual petitioning for renunciation has had criminal charges brought against him or has received a court sentence which is in effect and subject to execution, or if he owes taxes or other unpaid debts and commitments to the state and citizens of Turkmenistan or to enterprises, organizations, or institutions located on the territory of Turkmenistan.

=== Involuntary ===
Citizens of Turkmenistan may not be deprived of their Turkmenistani citizenship unless in the case of the following:

- As a result of the individual's entry into military service, the security service, police, justice organs, or other organs of state power and administration in another country, with the exception of cases specified by interstate agreements with Turkmenistan.
- If Turkmenistan citizenship has been acquired as a result of deliberately submitting false information or forged documents.

== Dual citizenship ==
Dual citizenship is not recognized in Turkmenistan. Turkmenistani citizen acquiring foreign citizenship will not lose their original citizenship in Turkmenistan, but will have trouble departing Turkmenistan and will have to renounce one of the citizenships.

== Travel freedom of Turkmen citizens ==
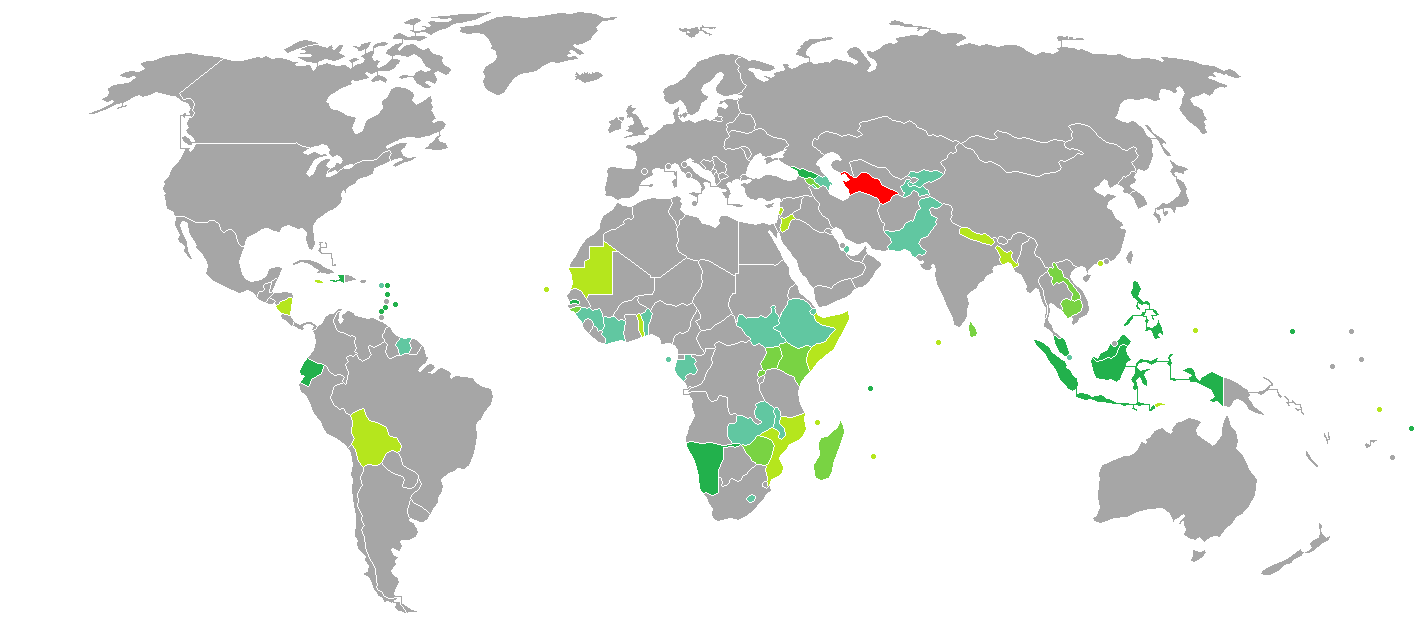
Visa requirements for Turkmenistanis citizens Turkmenistan Visa free access Visa on arrival eVisa Visa available both on arrival or online Visa required
