= Palauan nationality law =

Palauan nationality law is regulated by the 1980 Constitution of Palau, as amended; the 1994 Palau Citizenship Act, and its revisions; and international agreements entered into by the Palauan government. These laws determine who is, or is eligible to be, a national of Palau. The legal means to acquire nationality, formal legal membership in a nation, differ from the domestic relationship of rights and obligations between a national and the nation, known as citizenship. Palauan nationality is typically obtained either on the principle of jus soli, i.e. by birth in Palau or under the rules of jus sanguinis, i.e. by birth abroad to parents with Palauan nationality. It can be granted to persons with an affiliation to the country through naturalization.

== Acquiring Palauan nationality ==
Nationality in Palau is acquired at birth, or later in life by naturalization.

=== By birth ===
Birthright nationality applies to:

- Persons born in the territory to at least one parent who is a Palauan national or has legally recognized Palauan ancestry; or
- Persons born abroad to at least one parent who is a Palauan national or has legally recognized Palauan ancestry.

=== By naturalization ===
Nationality obtained through naturalization is available to those who have familial or historic relationship affiliations with Palau. Palau does not grant naturalization based upon residency in the country for a specified period of time, nor does it allow foreign spouses to derive nationality. Applicants for naturalization are required to have at least one parent who has recognized Palauan ancestry. Since 2010, in a ruling by the Appellate Division of the Palauan Supreme Court, in Ucherremasech v. Hiroichi, foreign adopted children who have one Palauan parent can be naturalized.

== Loss of nationality ==
Palauan nationals may not renounce their nationality. Denaturalization may occur if a person obtained naturalization through fraud, false representation, or concealment.

== Dual nationality ==
Since 2008, Palau has allowed dual nationality.

== History ==
=== Spanish period (1522–1898) ===
After Portuguese navigator Ferdinand Magellan died during his fleet's circumnavigation of the globe for Charles I, King of Spain, his ship Trinidad was captained by Gonzalo Gómez de Espinosa. Gómez's logs of 1522 reported two small islands were sighted at 5° North latitude, which he named San Juan. Historian Andrew Sharp, concluded the two islands were Fana and Sonsorol, now located in Palau. (Note: Sharp calls Fana by the name of Banna, a former name of the island.) Spain formally claimed the territories in the Micronesian region in 1686, but most of its focus was on Guam and the Philippines. In 1696 a group of Palauans were shipwrecked on Samar in the Philippines. Interviewed by the missionary Paul Klein (Pablo Clain), stones were arranged to form a map of their territory, which was later widely published in Europe. Its authenticity was debated and it sparked an interest in further discovery. Seven unsuccessful attempts were made to locate the islands Klein had described. In 1710, Francisco Padilla, captaining the patache Santissima Trinidad, made landfall on Sonsorol, the first verified European contact on Palau.

Until the 1780s Palau remained mostly isolated from European contact, though trading ships passed near it in route to China. American whalers encountered the islands as early as 1832 and French explorer Jules Dumont d'Urville spent two months in Palau in the winter of 1838–1839, evaluating the potential for whaling. Seventy years of instability in the Spanish empire continued until 1874 with periods of conflict followed by calm only to erupt into insurrection again. The 1812 Constitution of Cádiz was reinstated in 1836 and revoked a year later. Two Carlist Wars followed by the 1868 Revolution, led to a democratic experiment and the drafting of a new constitution in 1869. The constitution called for significant colonial reforms, but before they could be acted upon the Third Carlist War and subsequent restoration of the monarchy ended its authority. During this period, the Pacific colonies in the Caroline, Gilbert, Marshall, and Palau Islands remained mostly autonomous until 1874, when the Spanish attempted to reassert their authority there. That year, German trader Eduard Hernsheim founded a trading station on Malakal Island.

A new constitution was adopted by Spain in 1876, which was extended to the colonies. Under its terms, anyone born in Spanish territory was considered to be Spanish, but did not necessarily have the same rights as those persons born in Spain. From the early part of the 19th century, there were conflicts among European powers, who were establishing spheres of influence in the Pacific. By the 1880s, British, German, and Japanese firms were regularly trading in Spanish territory. Spain responded by sending emissaries to negotiate treaties with island chiefs to reinforce the relationship of the islands and mother country. In 1885, Germany annexed the Marshalls and attempted to take control of the Caroline Islands. That year, Spain sent missionaries to Palau to spread Christianity in the island. Spain retained control of the Carolines and Palau by granting Germany the right to trade and establish naval stations in the territory. To legitimize the agreement, a papal decree was obtained which confirmed Spanish sovereignty in the Caroline Islands, but established that Germany had a claim to the islands if Spain later decided to relinquish its authority. Germany and Britain signed the Anglo-German Declarations about the Western Pacific Ocean in 1886 to delineate the terms of their interaction and establish the territories with which each was aligned.

In 1889, the first Spanish Civil Code was adopted and extended to Puerto Rico, Panama, and the Captaincy General of the Philippines, which included all of Spain's Pacific possessions. The Code established that Spanish nationality was acquired either from birth in Spanish territory or by descent from a Spanish national. Legitimate children could derive nationality from a father, but only illegitimate children could derive Spanish nationality from a mother, as a married woman was required to take the nationality of her husband. It also contained provisions for foreigners to naturalize. At the end of the Spanish–American War in 1898, Germany agreed to support the United States' claims to Guam and the Philippines in exchange for American support of Germany's claim to the Caroline, Mariana and Palau islands. In 1899, Germany purchased these islands for 25 million Spanish pesetas, (around £1 million, and equivalent to GBP £111,000,000 in 2025 or US $151,000,000 in 2025, according to calculations based on retail price index measure of inflation).

=== German colonial period (1899–1920) ===
Upon acquiring Palau in 1899, German administrators designated that governance would continue under the two high chiefs and six lesser chiefs who were chosen by the inhabitants. Under the terms of the Colonial Act of 1888, German colonies were not part of the federal union, but they were also not considered foreign. Thus, laws that were extended to the colonies sometimes treated residents as nationals and other times as foreigners. Native subjects in the colonies were not considered to be German, but were allowed to naturalize. Naturalization required ten years residence in the territory and proof of self-employment. It was automatically bestowed upon all members of a family, meaning children and wives derived the nationality of the husband. The Nationality Law of 1913 changed the basis for acquiring German nationality from domicile to patrilineality, but did not alter derivative nationality.

From the time Germany took possession of Palau, Japanese traders had established strong ties there. At the outbreak of World War I, Japan joined the Allies and began an offensive to capture the German possessions in the Pacific. By October 1914, Japanese troops were in possession of Saipan. During their occupation maintained the German administrative system. At the end of the war, under terms of the Treaty of Versailles, Japan was granted the South Seas Mandate in 1919, which included the Caroline, Mariana, Marshall, and Palau islands. Terms of the mandate specified that islanders were not to be militarized and that social and economic development in the territory was to be of benefit to the local inhabitants.

=== Mandate, trustee period (1920–1978) ===
Between 1921 and 1922, administration for the Japanese Pacific colonies passed from the navy to civil authorities of the South Seas Bureau (Japanese: Nan'yō Chō). The native inhabitants of the islands were not equal to Japanese imperial subjects and were accorded different status. They were considered aliens, though if they met requirements of the 1899 Nationality Law, islanders could naturalize. Despite the League of Nations' mandate for Japan to treat the colonies as integral parts of the nation, Japan chose not to extend the constitution to their Pacific colonies. Japan surrendered its Pacific possessions at the end of World War II and the United States proposed retaining control over the former Japanese-mandated islands for security purposes. Mandates were replaced by Trust Territories to be overseen by a Trusteeship Council of the United Nations. In 1947, a trust agreement was drawn between the United Nations and the United States to establish the Trust Territory of the Pacific Islands.

Upon taking control of the region in July 1947, the United States Navy decreed the removal of Japanese immigrants and began the process of repatriating Japanese civilians. The Trust Territory was managed by the navy until 1951, at which time administration was passed to the United States Department of the Interior. The following year, the Code of the Trust Territory was introduced. It defined nationals as persons born in the territory prior to 22 December 1952, who had not acquired other nationality, or those born after that date in the territory. It also confirmed that children born abroad to parents who were nationals of the Trust Territory derived their parents' nationality until the age of twenty-one. Foreigners over the age of eighteen were allowed to naturalize in the Trust Territory. The Code, as amended in 1966 and 1973 authorized the Trust Territory to control immigration and granted authority to naturalize or denaturalize persons in the territory. Trust Territories nationals were not considered to be US nationals but were allowed to naturalize as would any other foreigner in the United States.

From 1969, the United States and representatives of the Trust Territory began negotiations to develop systems to terminate the trusteeship and provide pathways to independence. Because of the diversity of the districts of the territory, it was divided into four areas — Federated States of Micronesia, the Marshall Islands, the Northern Mariana Islands, and Palau — as it was deemed that a single set of documents would not adequately serve the political needs for the region. In 1975, the Northern Mariana Islands chose independence and left the Trust Territory in 1978. Negotiations continued with the remaining districts of the territory. A constitution for Micronesia was drafted and in 1978 voters in Kusaie, Ponape, Truk, and Yap ratified the document to form the Federated States of Micronesia. Voters in the Marshall Islands and Palau rejected the constitution. In 1979 the Marshall Islands created a separate constitution, as did Palau, but the United States objected to two land use provisions in the Palauan draft. The provisions refused to grant a foreign power eminent domain and the introduction of hazardous substances, including nuclear weapons, without the approval of 75% of the electorate of Palau.

A plebiscite ratified the constitution in July 1979 with 92% of the population in favor, but the High Court of the Trust Territories refused to certify the results because the legislature had nullified the draft based upon US objections. A second draft, striking the land use provisions was rejected by the voters later that year. A third draft, reinstating the two provisions, was passed by 79% of the voters in 1980. That year, a Compact of Free Association was drafted. It was signed by the US and Micronesia in 1982, by US and the Marshall Islands in 1983, and referendums observed by the UN approved the compacts that same year. In Palau, the plebiscite on the Compact did not reach the 3/4 approval mark required by the constitution and the Supreme Court of Palau concurred that the Compact was not approved by voters. A second referendum on a modified Compact held in 1984 also did not meet the 75% majority requirement. That year, a third version of the Compact was signed by Reagan and newly elected President of Palau Lazarus Salii. Receiving 72% approval in the vote, President Salii certified the results. Gibbons v Salli challenged the certification and the Palauan Supreme Court ruled that the constitutional provision for 75% approval was required and further, that the revised Compact allowing transport of nuclear weapons or using nuclear ships violated the constitutional provisions.

Ignoring the Supreme Court decision, the US Congress approved the Compacts and President Ronald Reagan announced in 1986 that the trusteeship was no longer applicable in the Federated States of Micronesia, the Marshall Islands, nor the Northern Marianas. Two additional plebiscites failed to garner sufficient votes to approve the Compact for Palau, leading the Palau National Congress to amend the constitution to allow a simple majority. The amendment was approved, as was the seventh draft of the Compact by a 73.3% majority in 1987. President Salii was able to overcome a challenge to the process by agreeing in a signed Memorandum of Understanding that the traditional council of chiefs had the authority to approve a cession of land to the United States by the Palauan president. Another lawsuit, Ngirmang v. Salii was filed in 1988, which nullified the constitutional amendment. A 1990 vote failed to achieve the required majority to accept the Palauan Compact, but that year the United Nations Security Council Resolution 683 terminated the trusteeship for the former Trust Territories, except Palau. In 1992, the Supreme Court allowed the constitution to be amended and to reflect a simple majority of the voters was required for changes to the constitution and to ratify the Compact. After the constitutional amendment passed in a 1992 referendum, a final plebiscite was held on the Compact in 1993, which was approved by more than 2/3 of the voters.

=== Post-independence (1994–present) ===
After signing the Compact, Palau gained its independence on 1 October 1994. Palau's constitution at independence conferred nationality upon any person of the former Trust Territory who had at least one parent of Palauan ancestry and no other nationality. The original language of the Constitution prohibited dual nationality, but an amendment in 2008 permitted Palauans to hold dual nationality.
