= Solomon Islands nationality law =

Solomon Islands nationality law is regulated by the 1978 Constitution of Solomon Islands, as amended; the Citizenship Act 2018, and its revisions; and international agreements entered into by the government of Solomon Islands. These laws determine who is, or is eligible to be, a national of Solomon Islands. The legal means to acquire nationality, formal legal membership in a nation, differ from the domestic relationship of rights and obligations between a national and the nation, known as citizenship. Solomon Islander nationality is typically obtained either on the principle of jus soli, i.e. by birth in the Solomon Islands or under the rules of jus sanguinis, i.e. by birth abroad to parents with Solomon Islander nationality. It can be granted to persons who have lived in the country for a specific period of time, or who have an affiliation to the country through naturalisation.

== Acquiring Solomon Islands nationality ==
Nationality in Solomon Islands is acquired at birth or later in life by naturalisation.

=== By birth ===
Birthright nationality applies to:

- Persons born anywhere to a parent who is a national of Solomon Islands.

=== By naturalisation ===
Regular naturalisation in Solomon Islands is acquired by submitting an application to the commission responsible for the administration of immigration. Applicants must provide evidence that they are of good character; have familiarity with Solomon Islander civics, language and customs; intend to live in the Solomon Islands, and have resided within the territory for a cumulative period of five years over the last ten years. Persons who may attain nationality by naturalisation include:

- The spouse of a native-born Solomon Islander, provided they have been married for five years;
- Persons who have at least one grandparent, or great-grandparent who was a native-born Solomon Islander; or
- Adoptees, upon completion of an adoption order.

== Loss of nationality ==
Solomon Islands nationals may renounce their nationality provided they have legal majority and capacity and have obtained other nationality. The request may be denied during times of war. Denaturalisation may occur if a person obtained nationality through fraud, false representation, or concealment; if they have served in a foreign military without authorization; or if they have committed certain criminal offences, like treason or terrorism.

== Dual nationality ==
Since 2018, Solomon Islands has allowed dual nationality.

== History ==
=== Spanish period (1568–1893) ===
In February 1568, Álvaro de Mendaña de Neira landed on Santa Ysabel Island and built a small settlement. Exploring the coast, they sighted or landed on Choiseul, the Florida Islands, Guadalcanal, Malaita, San Cristobal, the New Georgia Islands, the Olu Malau Islands, Savo, Ugi, and Ulawa, naming the chain the Islas Salomon (Solomon Islands). In the fall, Mendaña returned to the Americas with the plan to return and settle in the Solomons. He was unable to return until 1595, when he landed on the Santa Cruz Islands. By the end of the year, Mendaña died and the remaining settlers left for the Philippines. Spain neglected its claim on the Solomon Islands and contact did not recur until 1767, when a British naval officer, Philip Carteret anchored off the coast of Nendö Island, recognizing it as Mendaña's Santa Cruz. He also sighted Utupua and Vanikoro.

From the 1830s, contact between the islanders and Europeans increased with expansion of the whaling industry in the Pacific. Whalers typically stopped in the islands to resupply, which led to the development of trade networks. Beginning in the 1840s, islanders were recruited as labourers for plantations in Australia, Fiji and Samoa. Indentured workers were often blackbirded between islands. The Solomon Islands remained largely unsettled by Europeans and outside established trade routes into the 1870s. As labor demands increased in the period, Anglican missionaries moved in to the area and though they were eventually accepted, they were unable to achieve success with conversions. In 1884, Britain and Germany began negotiating which territories were within each nation's sphere of influence. They signed the Anglo-German Declarations about the Western Pacific Ocean in 1886, and Germany took possession of the North Solomon Islands annexing them to the protectorate of German New Guinea. At that time, Britain took no action in the Solomons, but when in 1893, the Colony of Queensland excellerated the labour trade, Britain declared the Southern Solomons a British protectorate.

=== British protectorate (1893–1978) ===
When British protectorates were established in 1815, there was little difference between the rights of British subjects and protected persons. By 1914, British protectorates were considered to be foreign territories lacking an internal government. When Britain extended this status over a territory, it took responsibility for both internal and external administration, including defence and foreign relations. Indigenous persons who were born in a protectorate were known as British Protected Persons (BPP) and were not entitled to be British nationals. BPPs had no right of return to the United Kingdom and were unable to exercise rights of citizenship; however, they could be issued a passport and could access diplomatic services when travelling abroad. Persons born in a British protectorate to a father who was a British national derived their nationality from their parent. In 1898, Samoan king Malietoa Laupepa died and Germany and the United States each annexed half of the island. To secure support in renouncing the British claim to German Samoa, in 1899, Germany ceded all of its islands in the Solomons, except those for the Bougainville and Buka Islands to Britain.

==== British subjects living in the Solomon Islands (1911–1978) ====
In 1911, at the Imperial Conference a decision was made to draft a common nationality code for use across the British Empire. The British Nationality and Status of Aliens Act 1914 allowed local jurisdictions in the self-governing Dominions to continue regulating nationality in their territories, but also established an imperial nationality scheme for use throughout the realm. The uniform law, which went into effect on 1 January 1915, required a married woman to derive her nationality from her spouse, meaning if he was British, she was also, and if he was foreign, so was she. It stipulated that upon loss of nationality of a husband, a wife could declare that she wished to remain British. It also provided that if a marriage had terminated, through death or divorce, a British-born national who had lost her status through marriage could reacquire British nationality through naturalisation without meeting a residency requirement. The statute reiterated common law provisions for natural-born persons born within the realm on or after the effective date. By using the word person, the statute nullified legitimacy requirements for jus soli nationals, meaning an illegitimate child could derive nationality from its mother. For those born abroad on or after the effective date, legitimacy was still required, and could only be derived by a child from a British father (one generation), who was natural-born or naturalised. Naturalisations required five years residence or service to the crown.

Amendments to the British Nationality Act were enacted in 1918, 1922, 1933 and 1943 changing derivative nationality by descent and modifying slightly provisions for women to lose their nationality upon marriage. Because of a rise in statelessness, a woman who did not automatically acquire her husband's nationality upon marriage or upon his naturalisation in another country, did not lose their British status after 1933. The 1943 revision allowed a child born abroad at any time to be a British national by descent if the Secretary of State agreed to register the birth. Under the terms of the British Nationality Act 1948, British nationals in the Solomon Islands were reclassified at that time as "Citizens of the UK and Colonies" (CUKC). The basic British nationality scheme did not change overmuch, and typically those who were previously defined as British remained the same. Changes included that wives and children no longer automatically acquired the status of the husband or father, children who acquired nationality by descent no longer were required to make a retention declaration, and registrations for children born abroad were extended.

==== British protected persons living in the Solomon Islands (1911–1978) ====
In 1914, the Alien Restriction Act clarified that while BPPs were not nationals, neither were they aliens. When the law was amended in 1919, that provision remained the same, meaning that BPPs could not naturalise. Until 1934, when the British Protected Persons Order was drafted, the status of BPP was not statutory, but rather granted at the prerogative of the monarch. Under the 1934 Order, Belonger status with regard to protected territories was defined to mean persons born before or after the Order in a protectorate who possessed no nationality and were not a British subject, or persons born abroad to a native of a protectorate who were stateless and not British subjects. The statute extended BPP status to children and wives of BPPs, if they were stateless, and specifically provided that if a woman married someone who was a national of another nation, she lost her BPP status. In 1943, the British Nationality Act clarified that BPPs born abroad in territories that were within the crown's dominions were British subjects by virtue of jus soli, but those born within a protectorate were not subjects.

Under the terms of the British Nationality Act 1948, BPPs of the Solomon Islands status did not change. However, the Act, while retaining the provisions that BPPs were not aliens and could not naturalise, allowed BPPs to register as BPP of a protected place or as a British subject under certain conditions. In 1949, the British Protectorates, Protected States and Protected Persons Order in Council repealed former orders about BPPs and detailed provisions for conferring protected status. It provided that protected persons were BPPs of a protectorate if they were born there; if they were born abroad to a father who was a native of a protectorate; or if at the time of their birth their father was a BPP. It also allowed women married to BPPs to register as a BPP and allowed certain nationals of foreign countries to register as BPPs. Minor changes to protected persons' status were made by Orders of Council in 1952, 1953, 1958, 1960, 1961, and 1962, but major changes did not occur until 1965.

Under the 1965 Order, the provisions of the 1949 order were retained, but new provisions for BPPs at birth included as BPPS, persons who would, except for the death of their father, have become BPPs; persons born aboard a ship or aircraft registered in a protectorate or unregistered but owned by the government of a protectorate; and foundlings discovered in a protectorate. In addition, stateless persons born prior to 28 January 1949 were allowed to register as BPPs if either of their parents were, or would have been except for death, BPPs on that date. Stateless persons born after that date could register if their parents were BPPs at the time of the child's birth. The 1974 Order removed all grounds for registration as a BPP in the Solomon Islands unless the person would be stateless. The following year, the name of the British Solomon Islands Protectorate was changed to the Solomon Islands, but it continued to be a protected territory until 1978.

=== Post-independence (1978–present) ===
At independence, the Solomon Islands became known as Solomon Islands. The government of Solomon Islands wanted to establish nationality only for persons who were indigenous to the islands. Britain wanted to confer nationality on all persons with a connection to Solomon Islands who were either British Protected Persons or Citizens of the United Kingdom and Colonies (CUKCs). As a compromise, only indigenous persons, defined as those who were born in Solomon Islands and had two grandparents who were members of an indigenous society in the New Hebrides, Papua New Guinean or Solomon Islands, automatically received nationality at independence. Anyone else who had been a protected person or CUKC in Solomon Islands could apply for nationality before 7 July 1980. It did not allow persons who had no connection to the country to naturalise. Meaning that persons born in the United Kingdom or other Commonwealth countries who were born, registered, or naturalised in a jurisdiction other than Solomon Islands were not allowed to apply for nationality at independence. If an applicant's naturalisation was approved, they would cease to be protected persons or CUKCs, upon being granted Solomon Islander nationality. Persons who were previously BPPs who did not apply by the 1980 deadline, ceased to be BPPs unless they would be rendered stateless.

Subsequent to the Constitution, Solomon Island passed a Citizenship Act in 1978 Provisions of the 1978 Act were gender discriminatory. They allowed children to derive the nationality of their fathers after independence if they were legitimate and of their mothers if they were illegitimate. In the case of a joint adoption, only the father's nationality could be given to a child. While they allowed a foreign wife to acquire nationality based upon her husband's status as a national of Solomon Islands, she was required to obtain her spouse's permission to change her nationality. A native-born woman's foreign husband could not obtain her nationality, nor could her children be naturalised. A woman was considered to have renounced her Solomon Islander nationality by marrying a foreigner and could repatriate only if the marriage had terminated. If a wife was a foreign woman who had acquired nationality through her native spouse and the couple divorced, she could lose her nationality upon remarriage, if her new spouse was a foreigner. Men could not lose their nationality because of marriage.

After the conclusion of a civil war in the 1990s, the government agreed that to establish long-term peace, the governmental system and constitution needed to be changed. After calling a constitutional convention, a Draft Constitution was proposed in 2004, which was unsuccessful. Additional drafts were produced in 2009, 2011, and 2014. In 2016, a consultation was held to approve a new draft of the constitution and leaders of the provinces agreed to the federal draft, but suggested a change to one section dealing with the repatriation of land customary owners. Final changes were due to be presented to the Prime Minister in June 2017. (Note: As amendment was made to the 1978 Constitution to grant dual nationality in 2018 and the 1978 Constitution was in force in 2020, it would appear the 2016 Draft constitution has not yet gone to public referendum.) In 2018, Solomon Islands revised its Citizenship Act to eliminate gender discrimination and allow women equality in changing or retaining their nationality. The parliament also passed a Constitutional Amendment 2018 to allow dual nationality. A program to consider nationality through investment was being debated by parliament in 2020.
