= List of diplomatic missions of Argentina =

The Argentine Republic has the 15th most diplomatic missions of any country in the world, with posts in 85 of the 193 members states of the United Nations, as well as observer states Palestine and Vatican City, and Taiwan. Argentina's diplomatic network also has a very strong focus on the Americas. This list excludes honorary consulates.

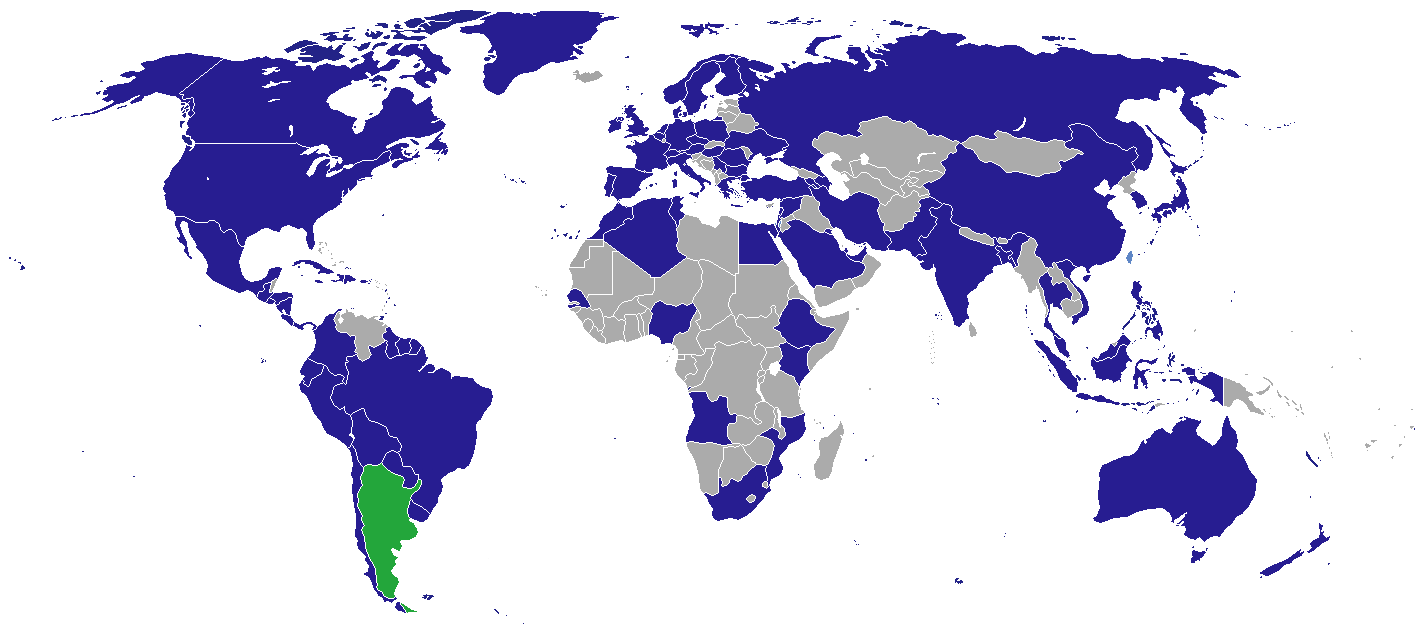
Diplomatic missions of Argentina

== Current missions ==
=== Africa ===
| Host country | Host city | Mission | Concurrent accreditation | Ref. |
|---|---|---|---|---|
| Algeria | Algiers | Embassy | | |
| Angola | Luanda | Embassy | | |
| Egypt | Cairo | Embassy | Countries: Sudan | |
| Ethiopia | Addis Ababa | Embassy | Countries: Djibouti; Multilateral Organizations: African Union (Note: Accredited as an observer mission.) | |
| Kenya | Nairobi | Embassy | Countries: Burundi; Comoros; Congo-Kinshasa; Eritrea; Madagascar; Rwanda; Seychelles; Somalia; Tanzania; Uganda; Multilateral Organizations: United Nations; United Nations Environment Programme; United Nations Human Settlements Programme | |
| Morocco | Rabat | Embassy | | |
| Mozambique | Maputo | Embassy | | |
| Nigeria | Abuja | Embassy | Countries: Benin; Burkina Faso; Cameroon; Chad; Central African Republic; Congo-Brazzaville; Equatorial Guinea; Gabon; Gambia; Ghana; Guinea; Guinea-Bissau; Ivory Coast; Liberia; Mali; Niger; São Tomé and Príncipe; Sierra Leone; Togo | |
| Senegal | Dakar | Embassy | | |
| South Africa | Pretoria | Embassy | Countries: Botswana; Eswatini; Lesotho; Malawi; Mauritius; Namibia; Zambia; Zimbabwe | |
| South Africa | Johannesburg | Consulate-General | Countries: Botswana; Eswatini; Lesotho; Malawi; Mauritius; Namibia; Zambia; Zimbabwe | |
| Tunisia | Tunis | Embassy | Countries: Libya; Mauritania | |

=== Americas ===
| Host country | Host city | Mission | Concurrent accreditation | Ref. |
|---|---|---|---|---|
| Barbados | Bridgetown | Embassy | Countries: Dominica; Saint Kitts and Nevis; Saint Lucia | |
| Bolivia | La Paz | Embassy | | |
| Bolivia | La Paz | Consulate-General | | |
| Bolivia | Santa Cruz de la Sierra | Consulate-General | | |
| Bolivia | Tarija | Consulate-General | | |
| Bolivia | Cochabamba | Consulate | | |
| Bolivia | Villazón | Consulate | | |
| Bolivia | Yacuiba | Consulate | | |
| Brazil | Brasília | Embassy | | |
| Brazil | Belo Horizonte | Consulate-General | | |
| Brazil | Porto Alegre | Consulate-General | | |
| Brazil | Rio de Janeiro | Consulate-General | | |
| Brazil | São Paulo | Consulate-General | | |
| Brazil | Curitiba | Consulate | | |
| Brazil | Florianópolis | Consulate | | |
| Brazil | Foz do Iguaçu | Consulate | | |
| Brazil | Recife | Consulate | | |
| Brazil | Salvador da Bahia | Consulate | | |
| Brazil | Uruguaiana | Consulate | | |
| Canada | Ottawa | Embassy | | |
| Canada | Montreal | Consulate-General | | |
| Canada | Toronto | Consulate-General | | |
| Canada | Vancouver | Consulate-General | | |
| Chile | Santiago de Chile | Embassy | | |
| Chile | Santiago de Chile | Consulate-General | | |
| Chile | Punta Arenas | Consulate-General | | |
| Chile | Valparaíso | Consulate-General | | |
| Chile | Antofagasta | Consulate | | |
| Chile | Concepción | Consulate | | |
| Chile | Puerto Montt | Consulate | | |
| Colombia | Bogotá | Embassy | | |
| Costa Rica | San José | Embassy | | |
| Cuba | Havana | Embassy | | |
| Dominican Republic | Santo Domingo | Embassy | | |
| Ecuador | Quito | Embassy | | |
| Ecuador | Guayaquil | Consulate | | |
| El Salvador | San Salvador | Embassy | | |
| Guatemala | Guatemala City | Embassy | | |
| Guyana | Georgetown | Embassy | | |
| Haiti | Port-au-Prince | Embassy | | |
| Honduras | Tegucigalpa | Embassy | | |
| Jamaica | Kingston | Embassy | Countries: Antigua and Barbuda | |
| Mexico | Mexico City | Embassy | Countries: Belize | |
| Mexico | Mexico City | Consulate-General | Countries: Belize | |
| Mexico | Playa del Carmen | Consulate | Countries: Belize | |
| Nicaragua | Managua | Embassy | | |
| Panama | Panama City | Embassy | | |
| Paraguay | Asunción | Embassy | | |
| Paraguay | Asunción | Consulate-General | | |
| Paraguay | Ciudad del Este | Consulate-General | | |
| Paraguay | Encarnación | Consulate-General | | |
| Peru | Lima | Embassy | | |
| Peru | Lima | Consulate-General | | |
| Suriname | Paramaribo | Embassy | | |
| Trinidad and Tobago | Port of Spain | Embassy | Countries: Grenada; Saint Vincent and the Grenadines | |
| United States | Washington, D.C. | Embassy | | |
| United States | Atlanta | Consulate-General | | |
| United States | Chicago | Consulate-General | | |
| United States | Houston | Consulate-General | | |
| United States | Los Angeles | Consulate-General | | |
| United States | Miami | Consulate-General | | |
| United States | New York City | Consulate-General | | |
| Uruguay | Montevideo | Embassy | Multilateral Organizations: Latin American Integration Association; Mercosur | |
| Uruguay | Montevideo | Consulate-General | Multilateral Organizations: Latin American Integration Association; Mercosur | |
| Uruguay | Colonia del Sacramento | Consulate | Multilateral Organizations: Latin American Integration Association; Mercosur | |
| Uruguay | Fray Bentos | Consulate | Multilateral Organizations: Latin American Integration Association; Mercosur | |
| Uruguay | Maldonado | Consulate | Multilateral Organizations: Latin American Integration Association; Mercosur | |
| Uruguay | Paysandú | Consulate | Multilateral Organizations: Latin American Integration Association; Mercosur | |
| Uruguay | Salto | Consulate | Multilateral Organizations: Latin American Integration Association; Mercosur | |

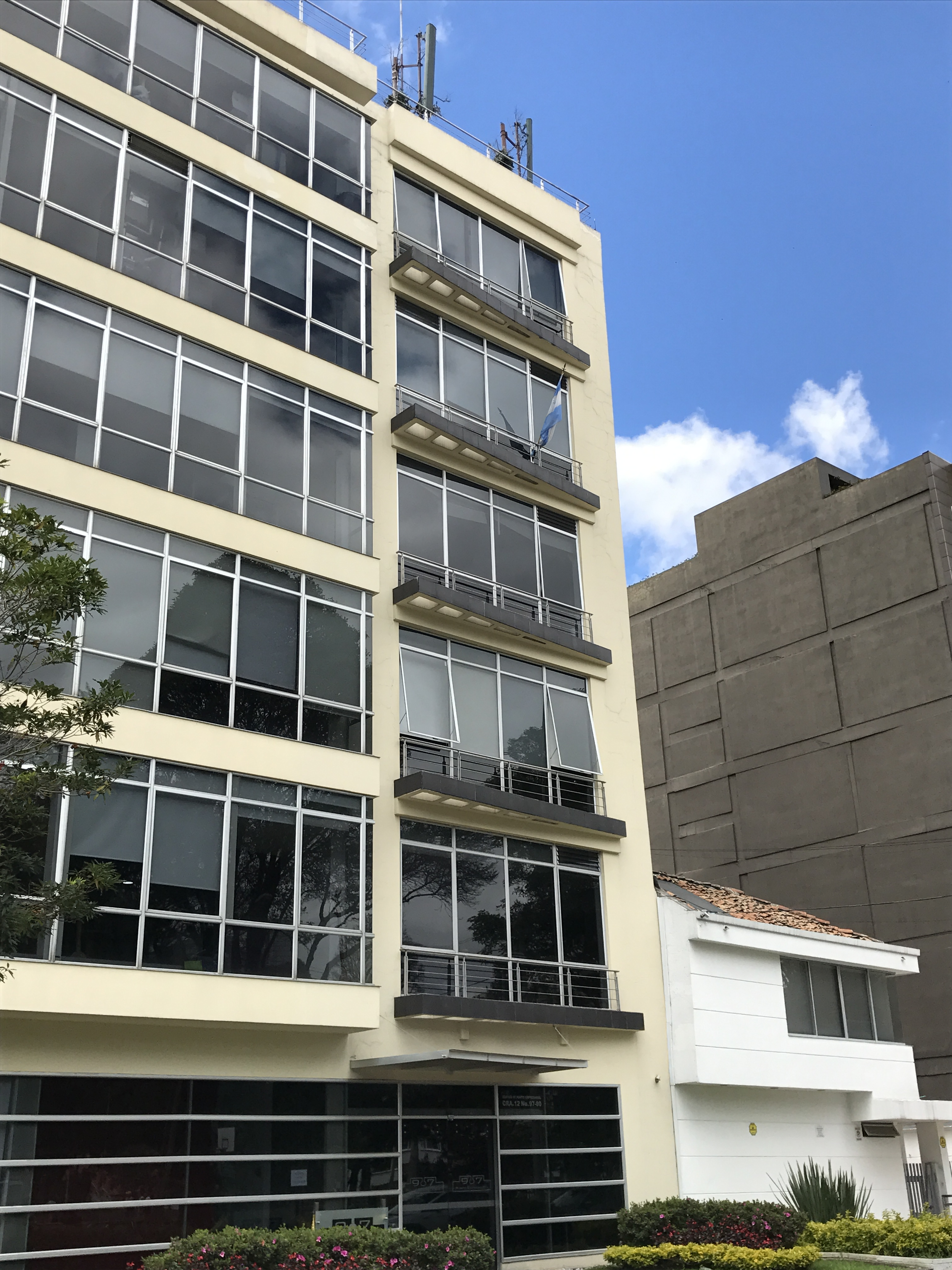
Embassy in Bogotá

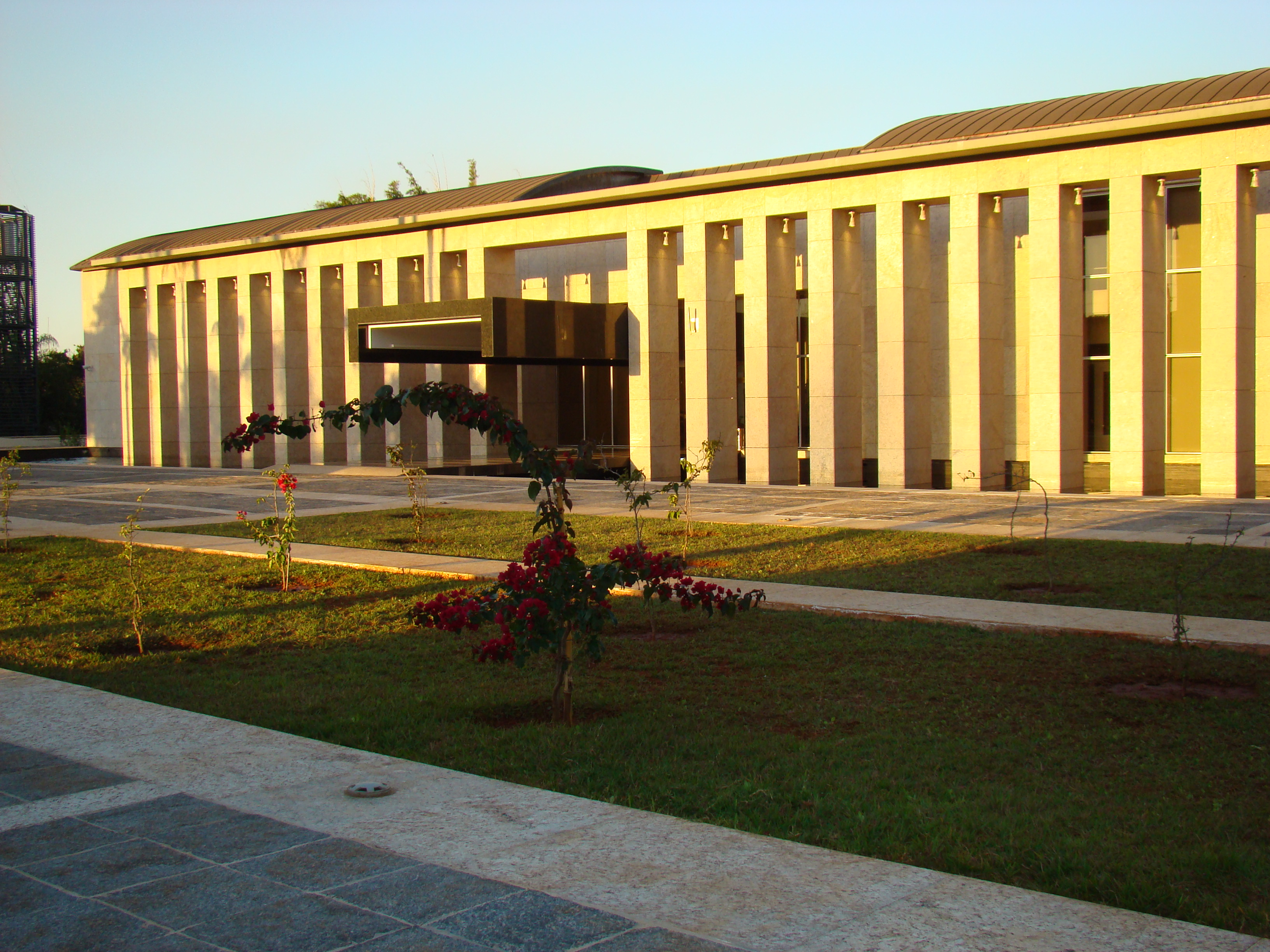
Embassy in Brasília

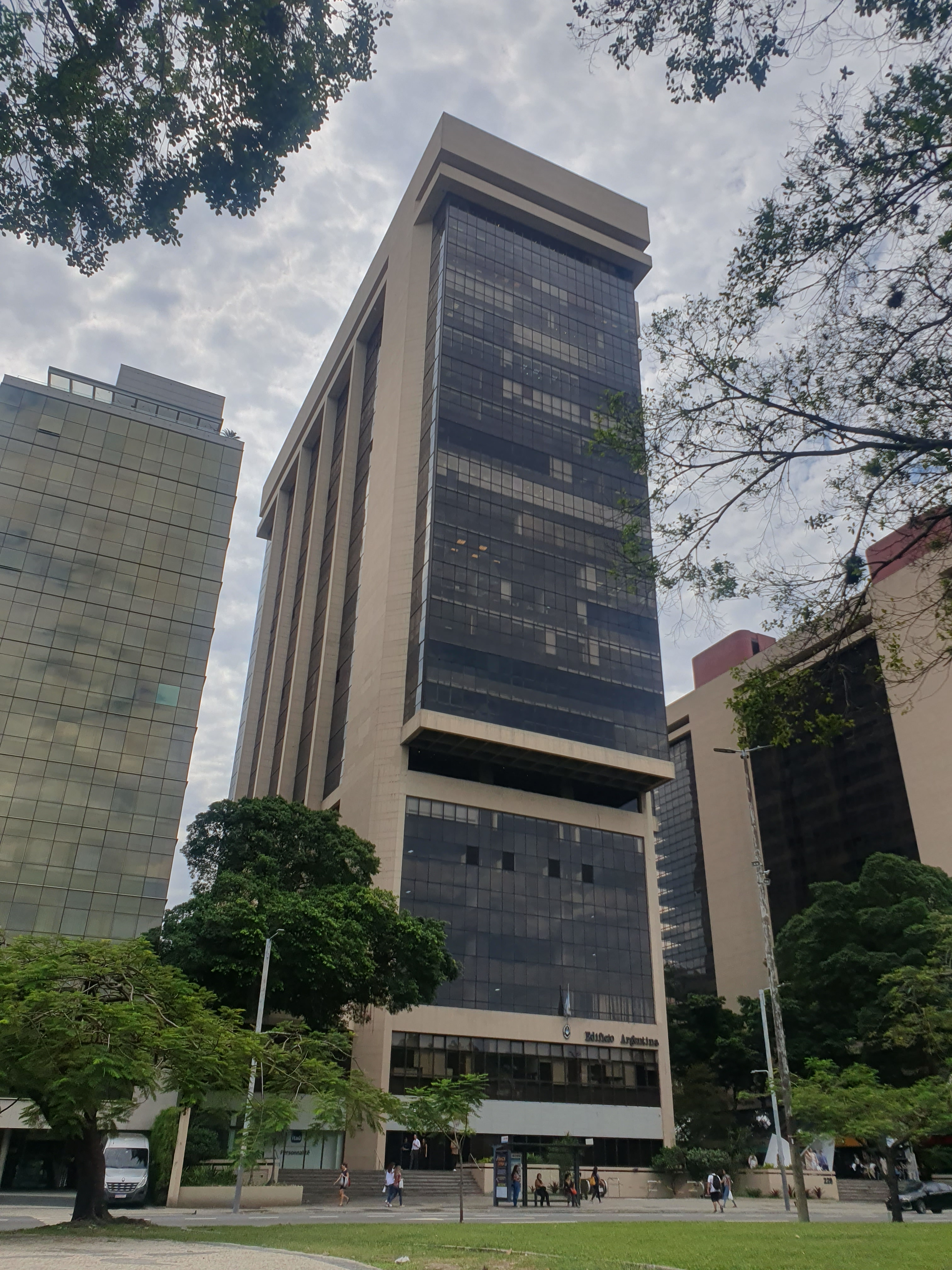
Building hosting the Consulate-General in Rio de Janeiro

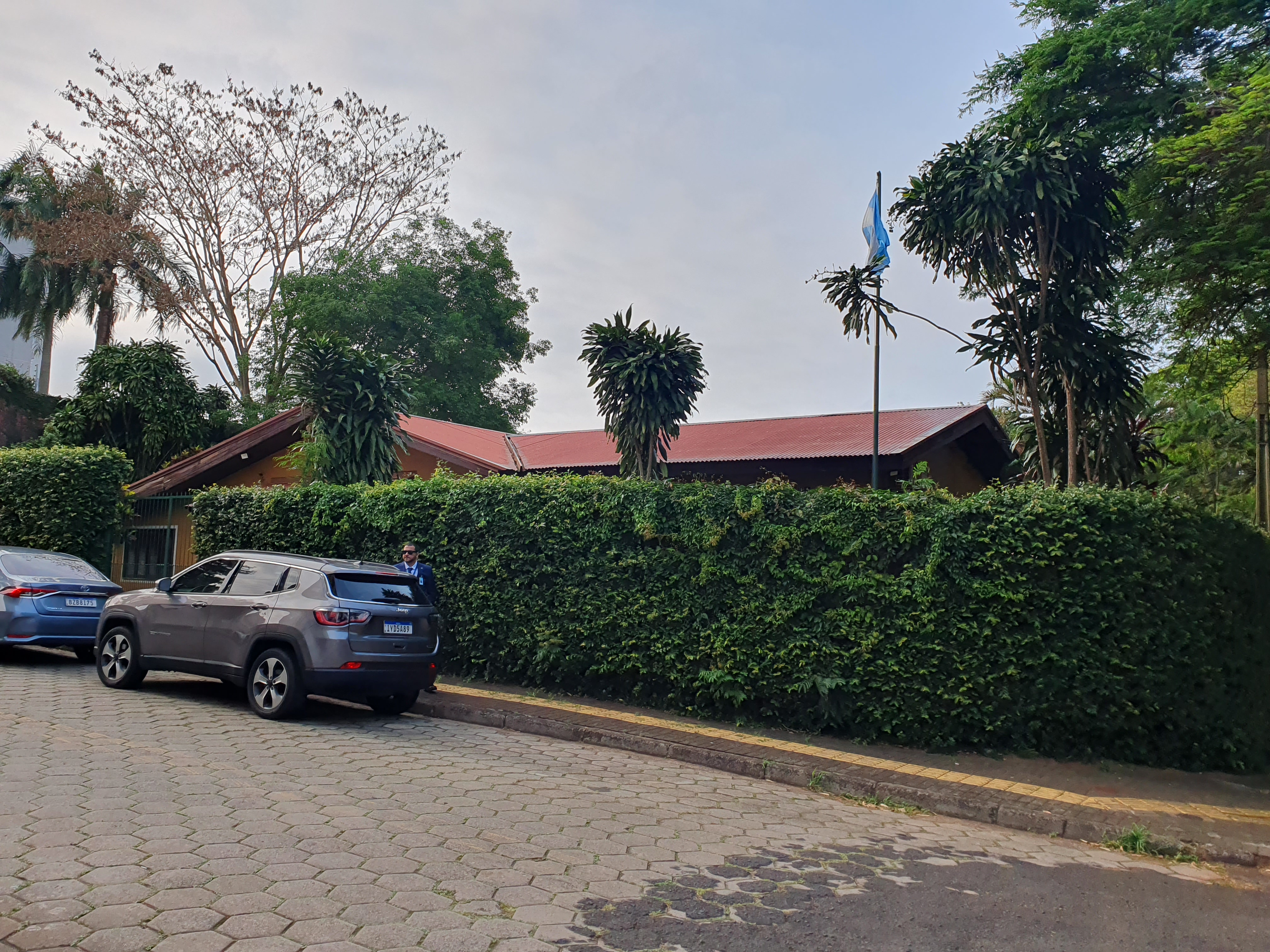
Consulate in Foz do Iguaçu

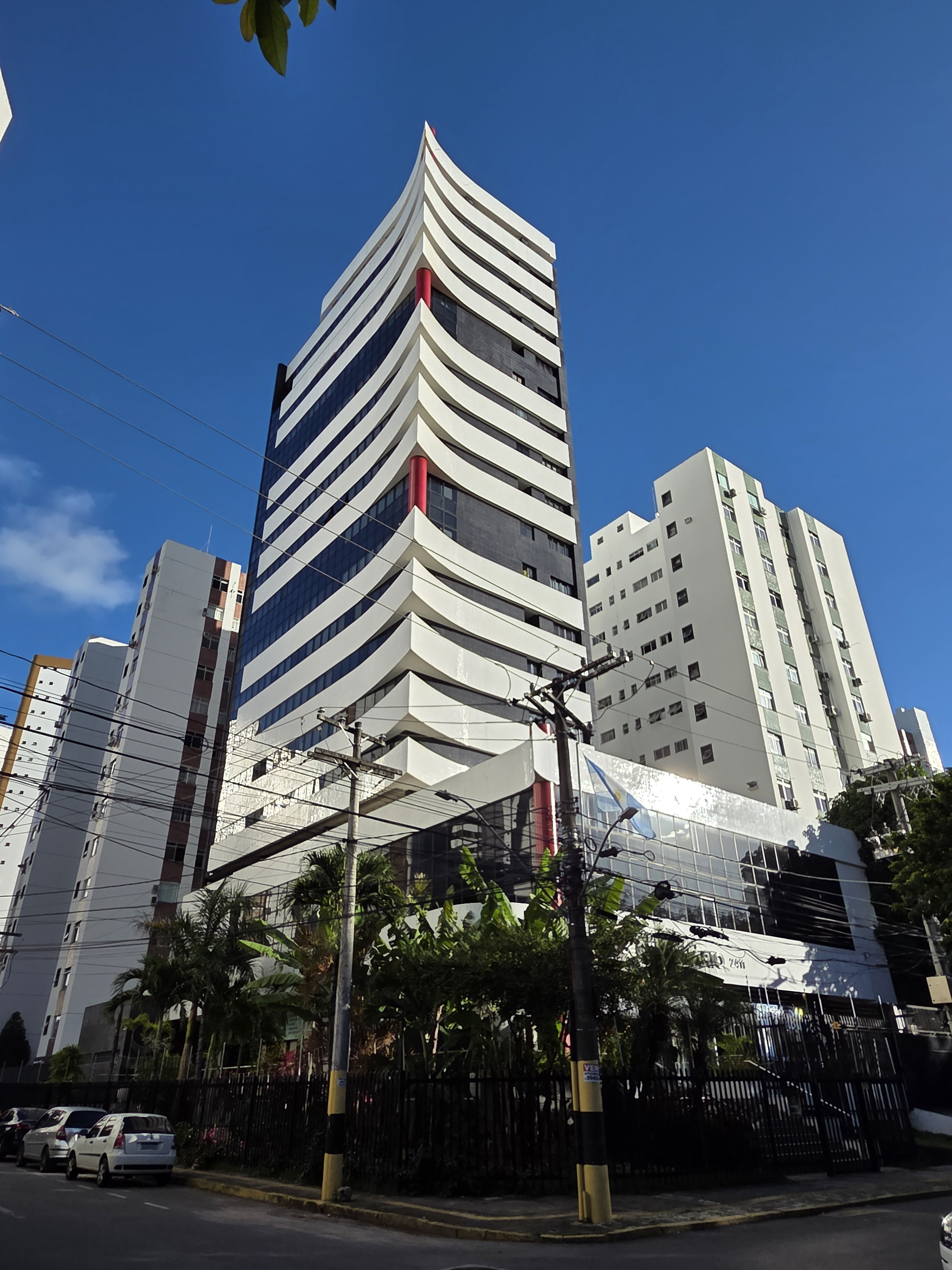
Building hosting the Consulate in Salvador da Bahia

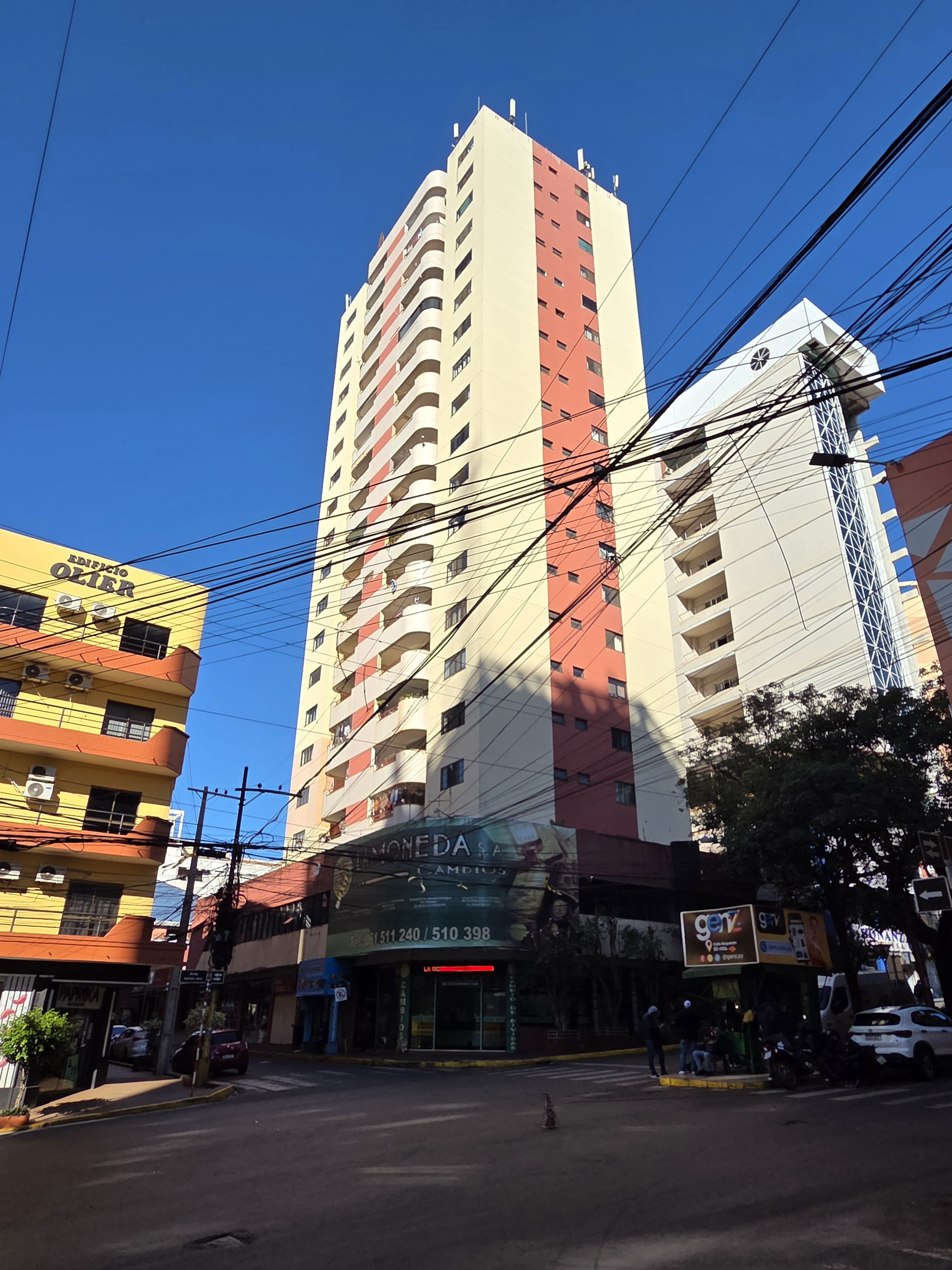
Building hosting the Consulate-General in Ciudad del Este

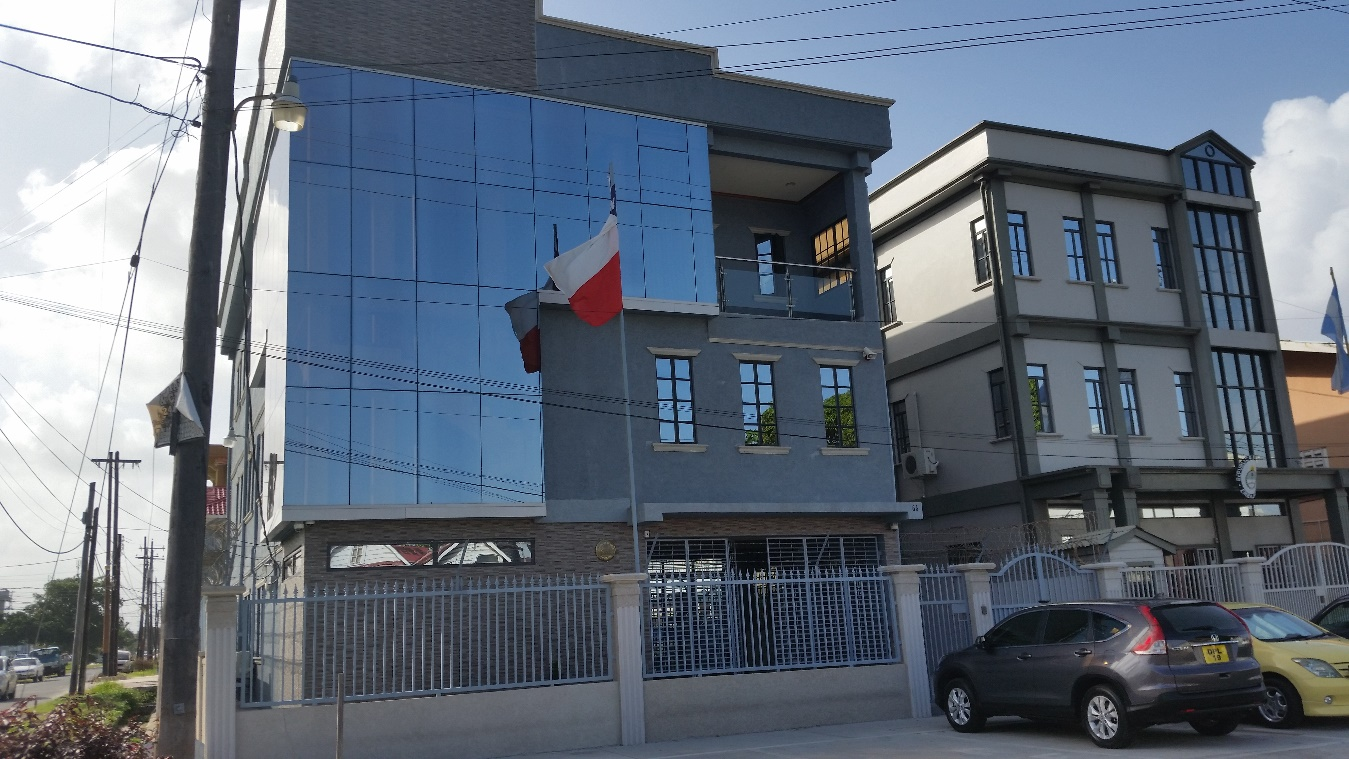
Embassy in Georgetown

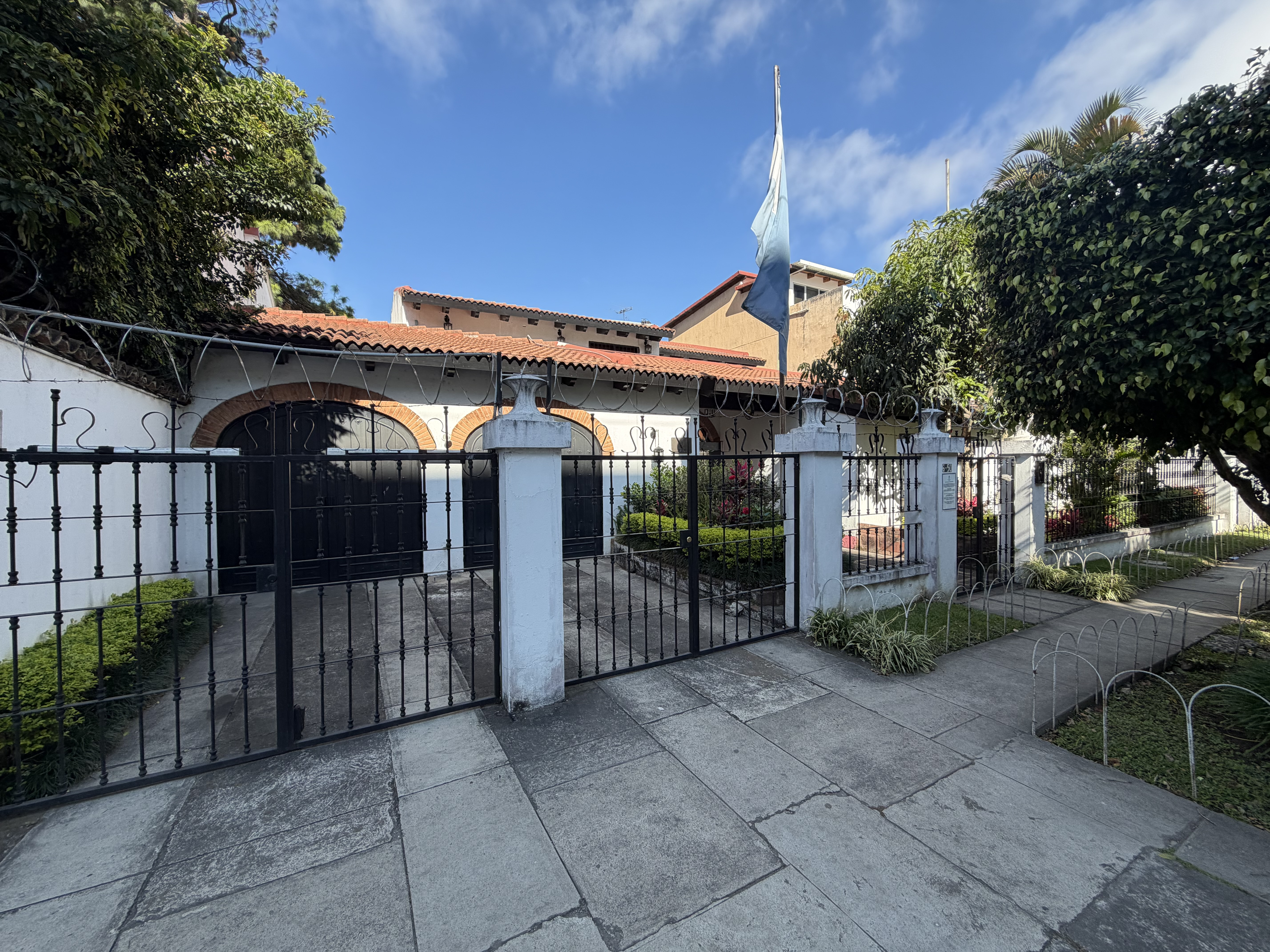
Embassy in Guatemala City

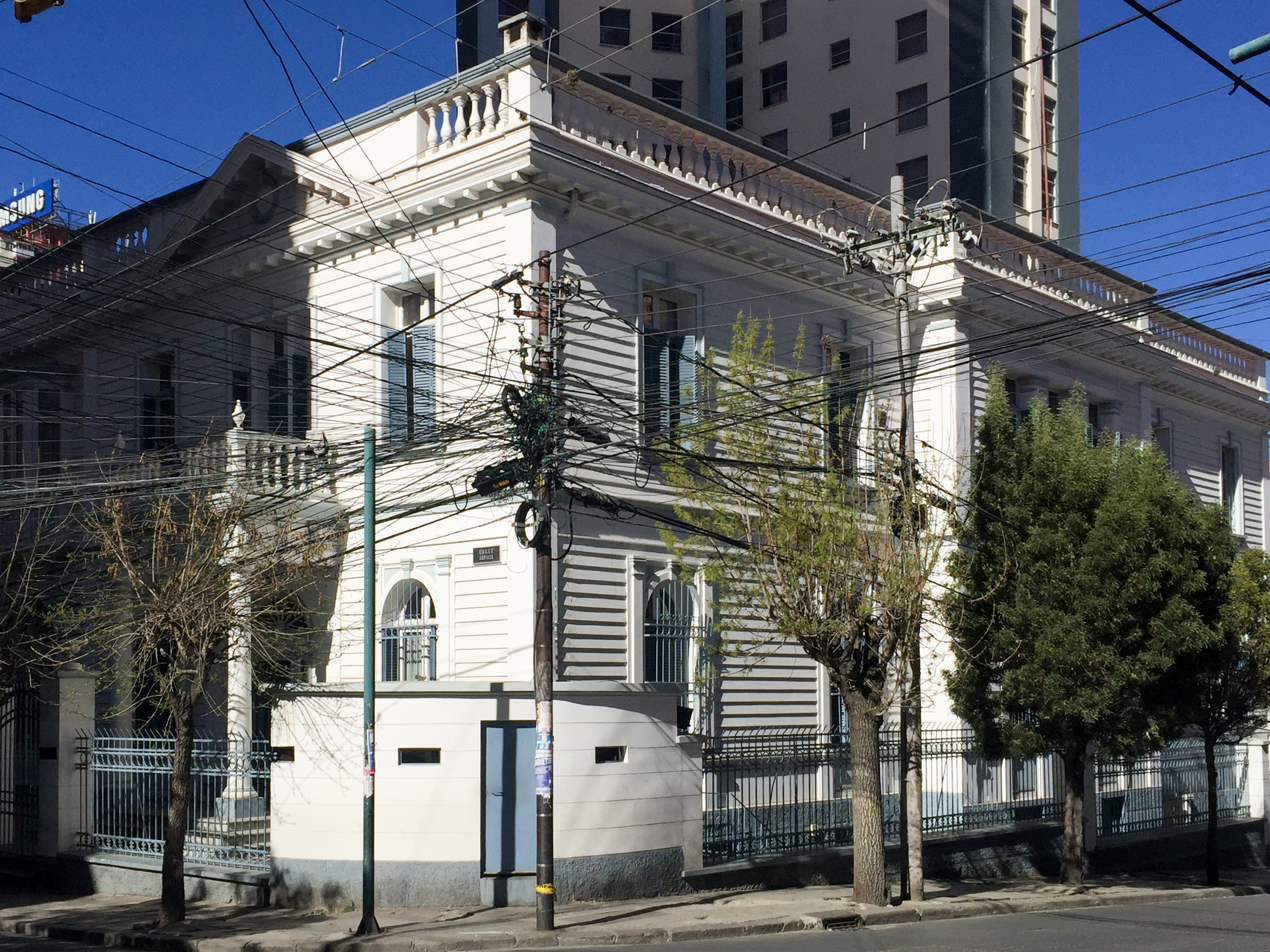
Embassy in La Paz

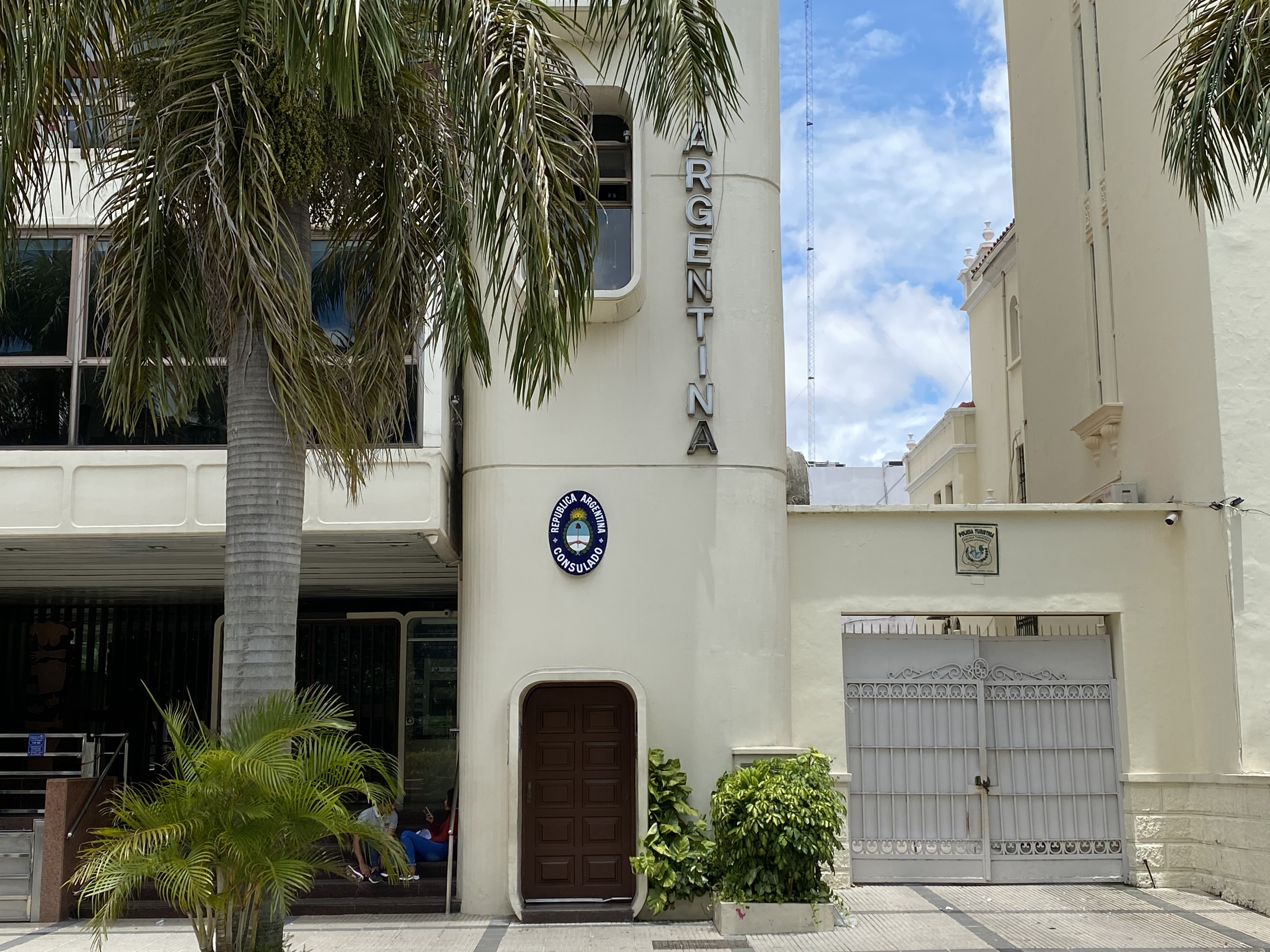
Consulate-General in Santa Cruz de la Sierra

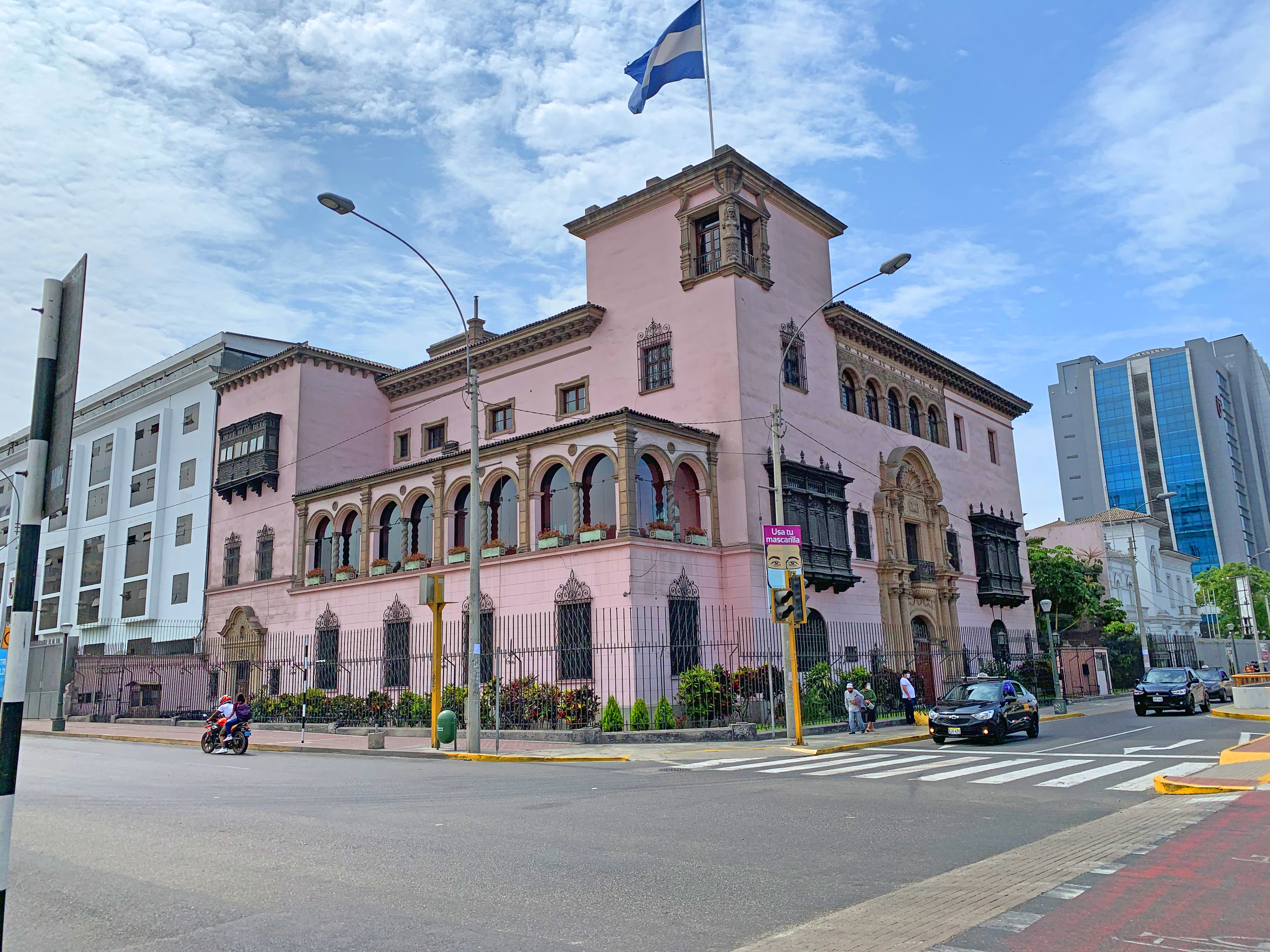
Embassy in Lima

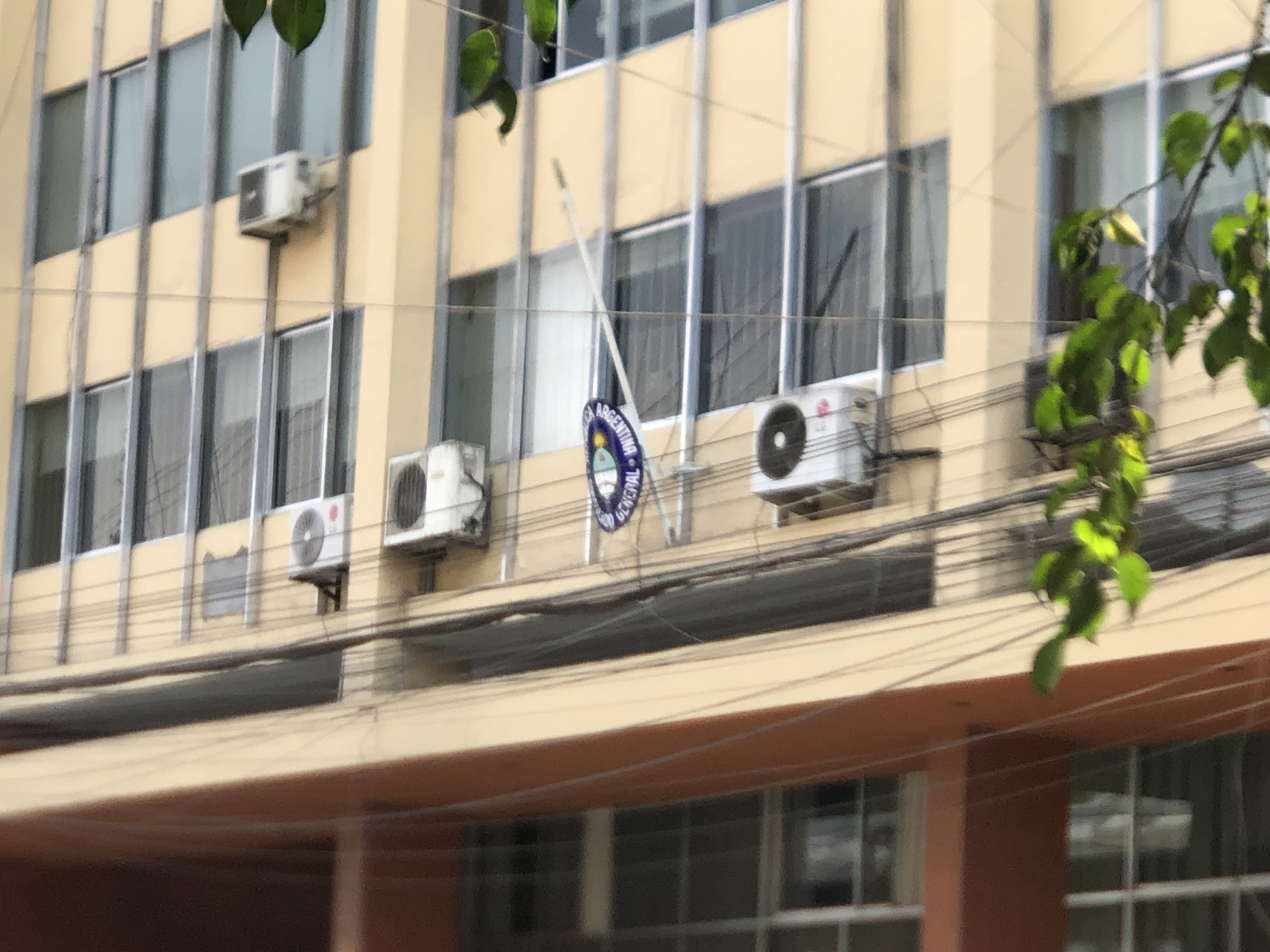
Consulate-General in Lima

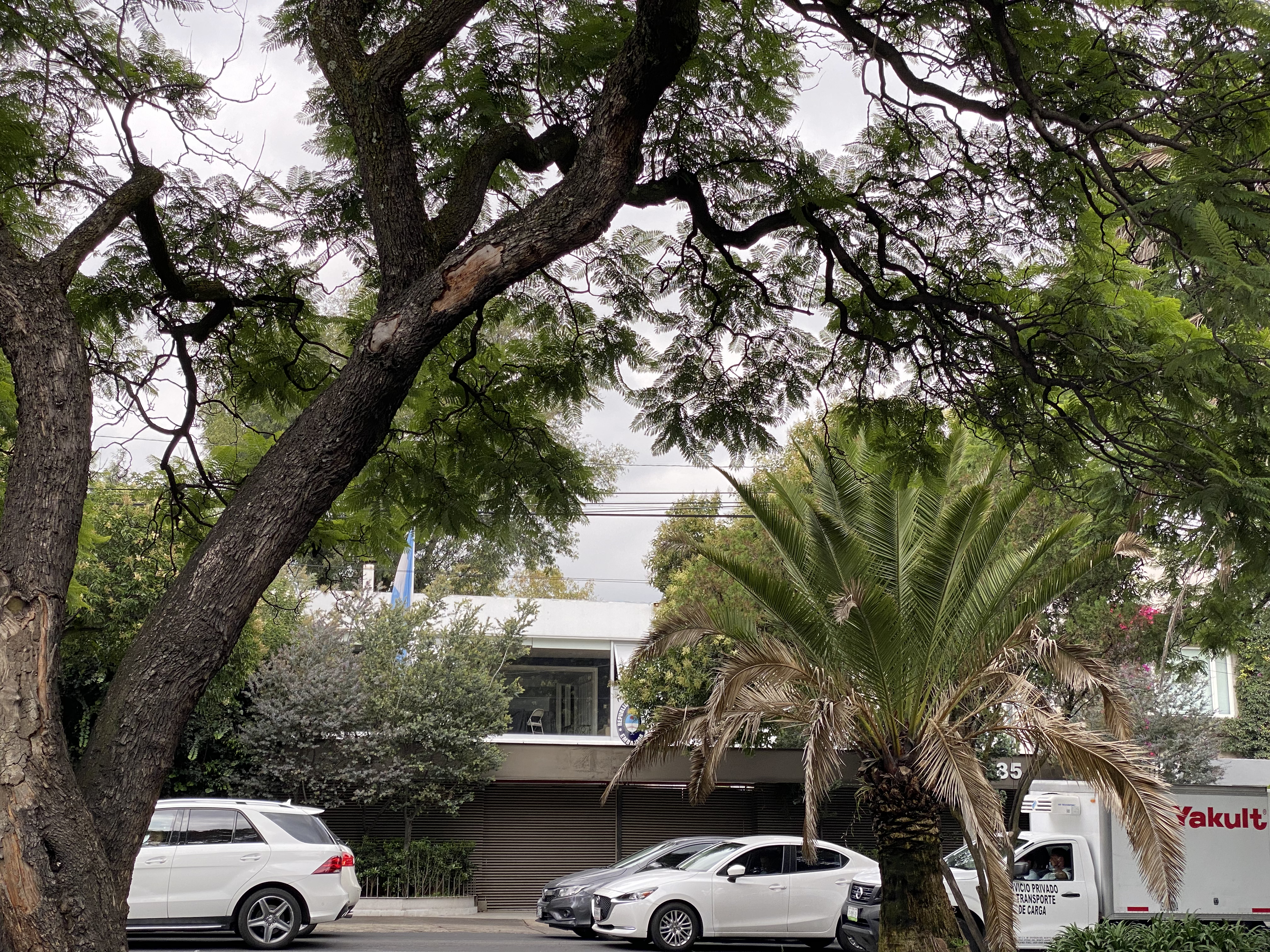
Embassy in Mexico City

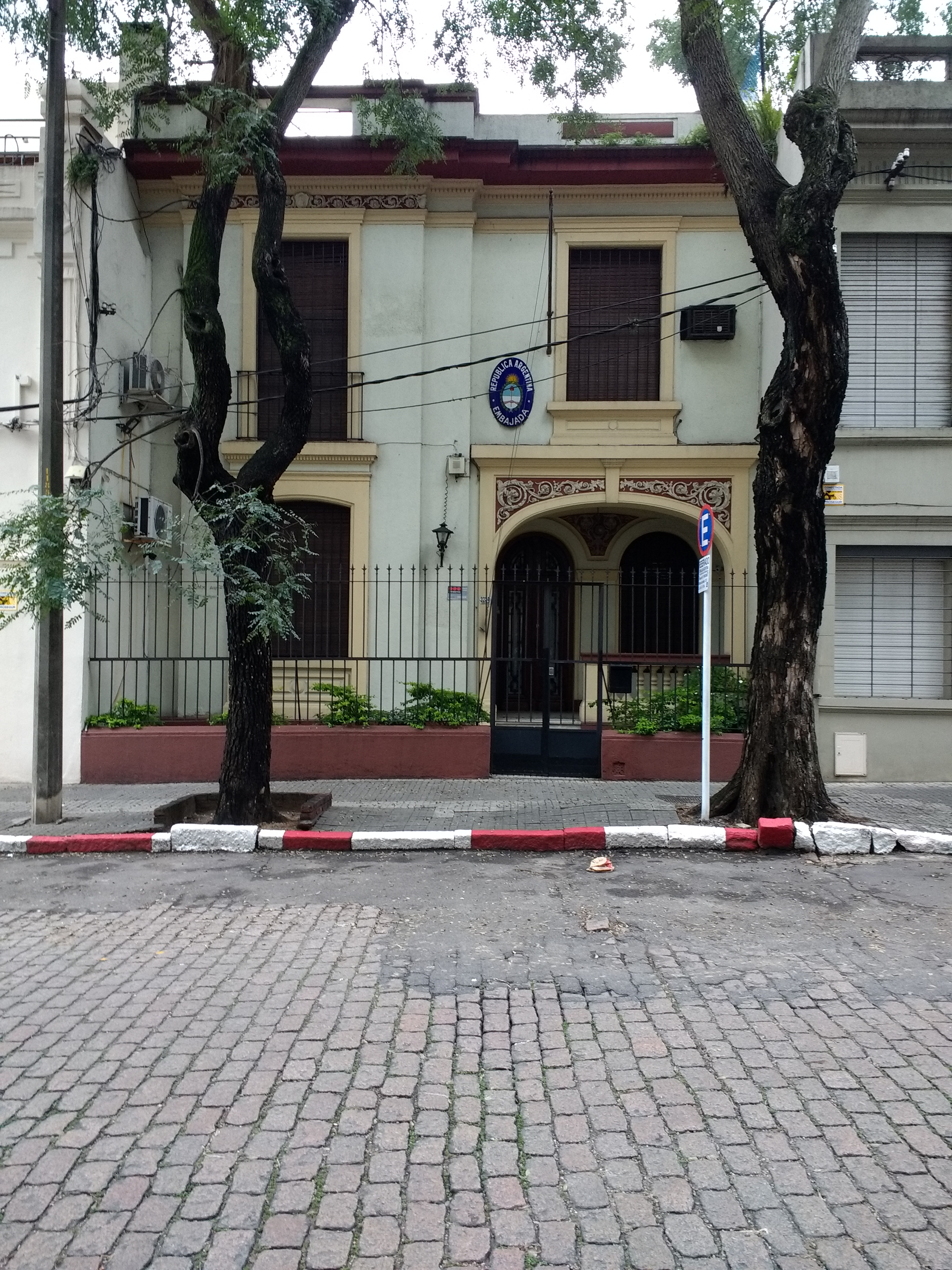
Embassy in Montevideo

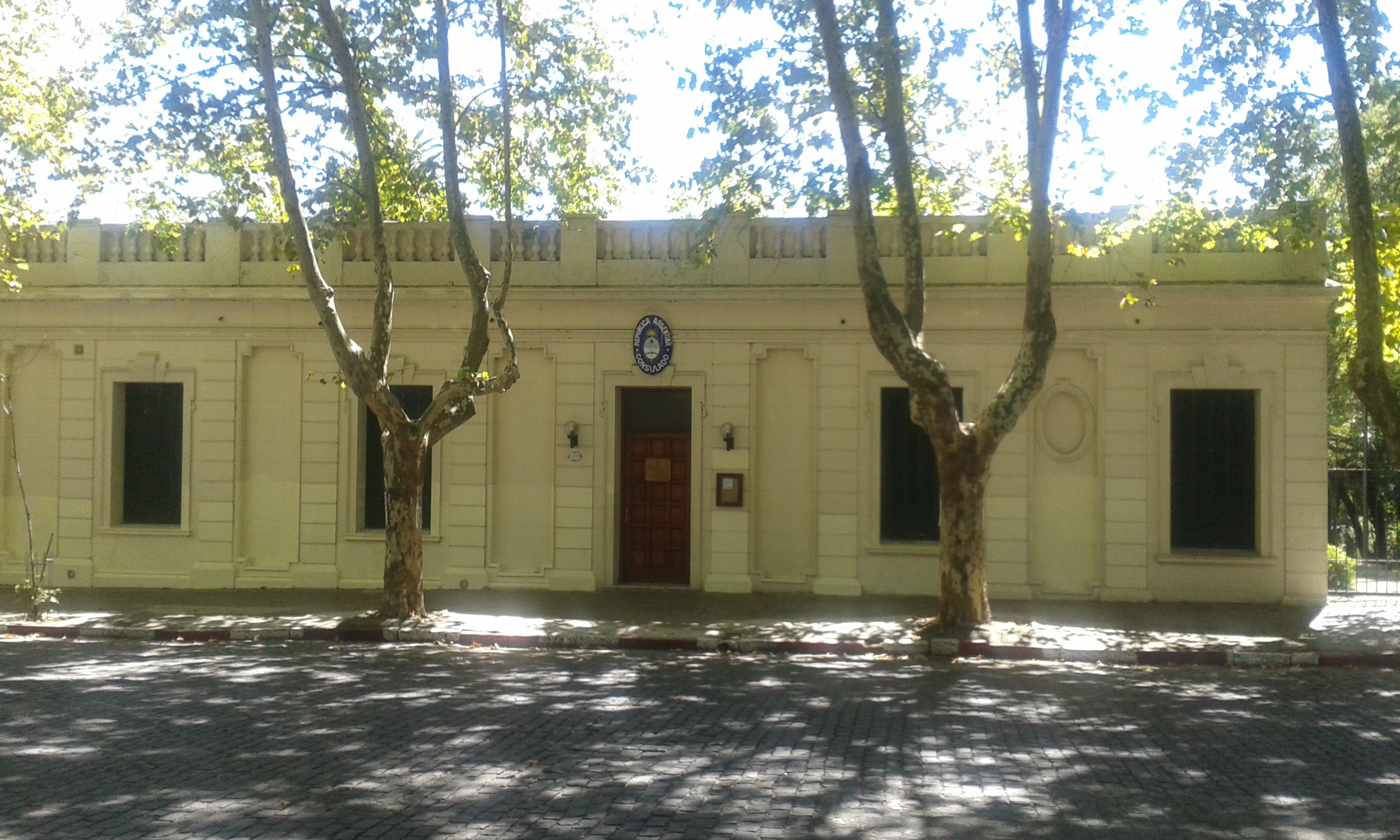
Consulate in Colonia del Sacramento

Embassy in Quito

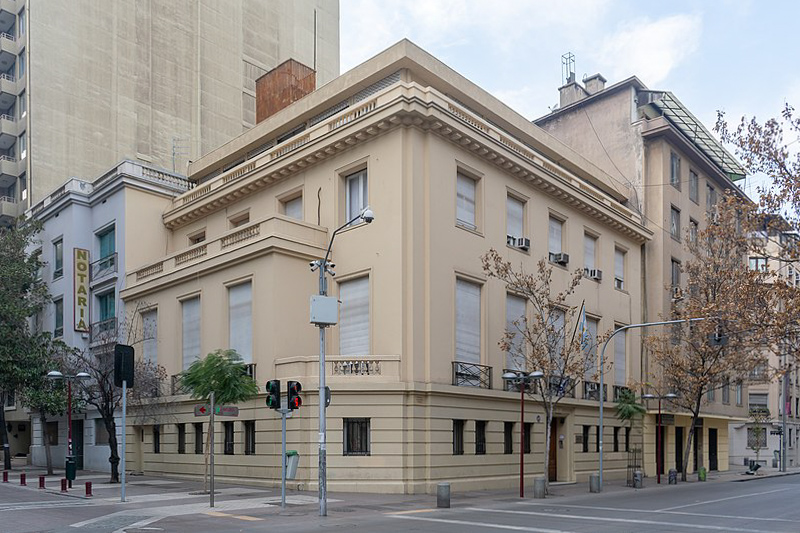
Embassy in Santiago

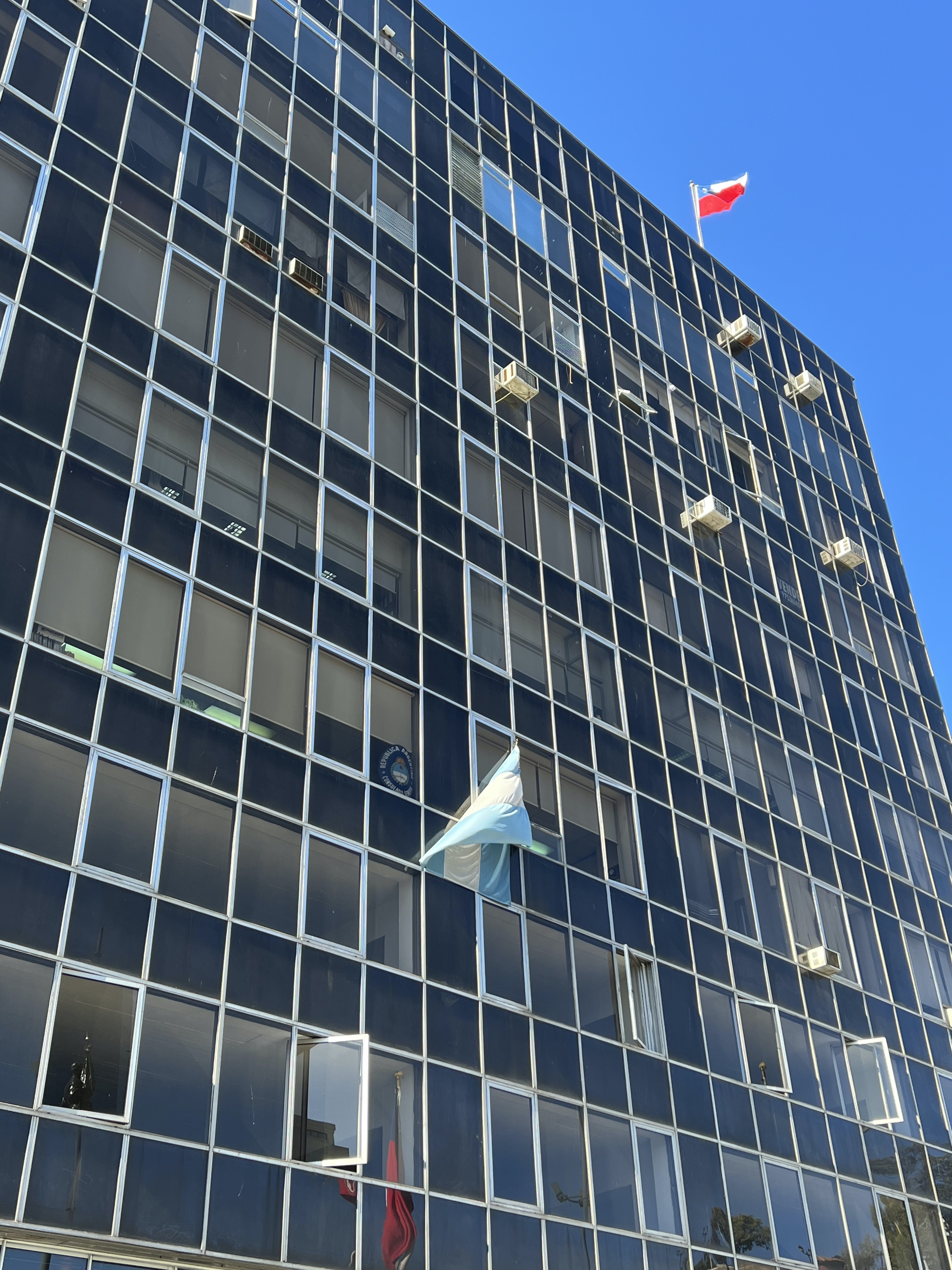
Consulate-General in Valparaíso

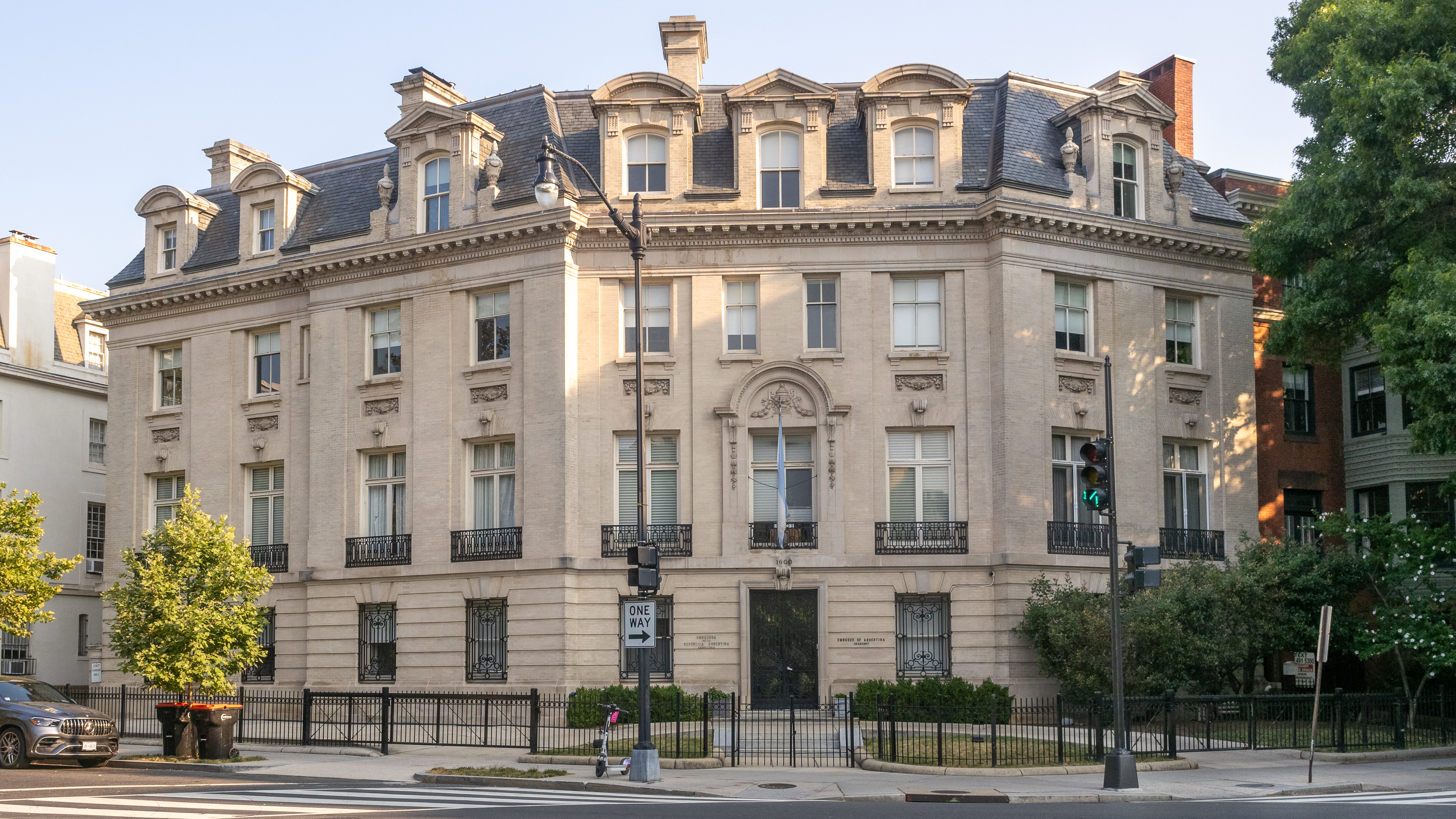
Embassy in Washington, D.C.

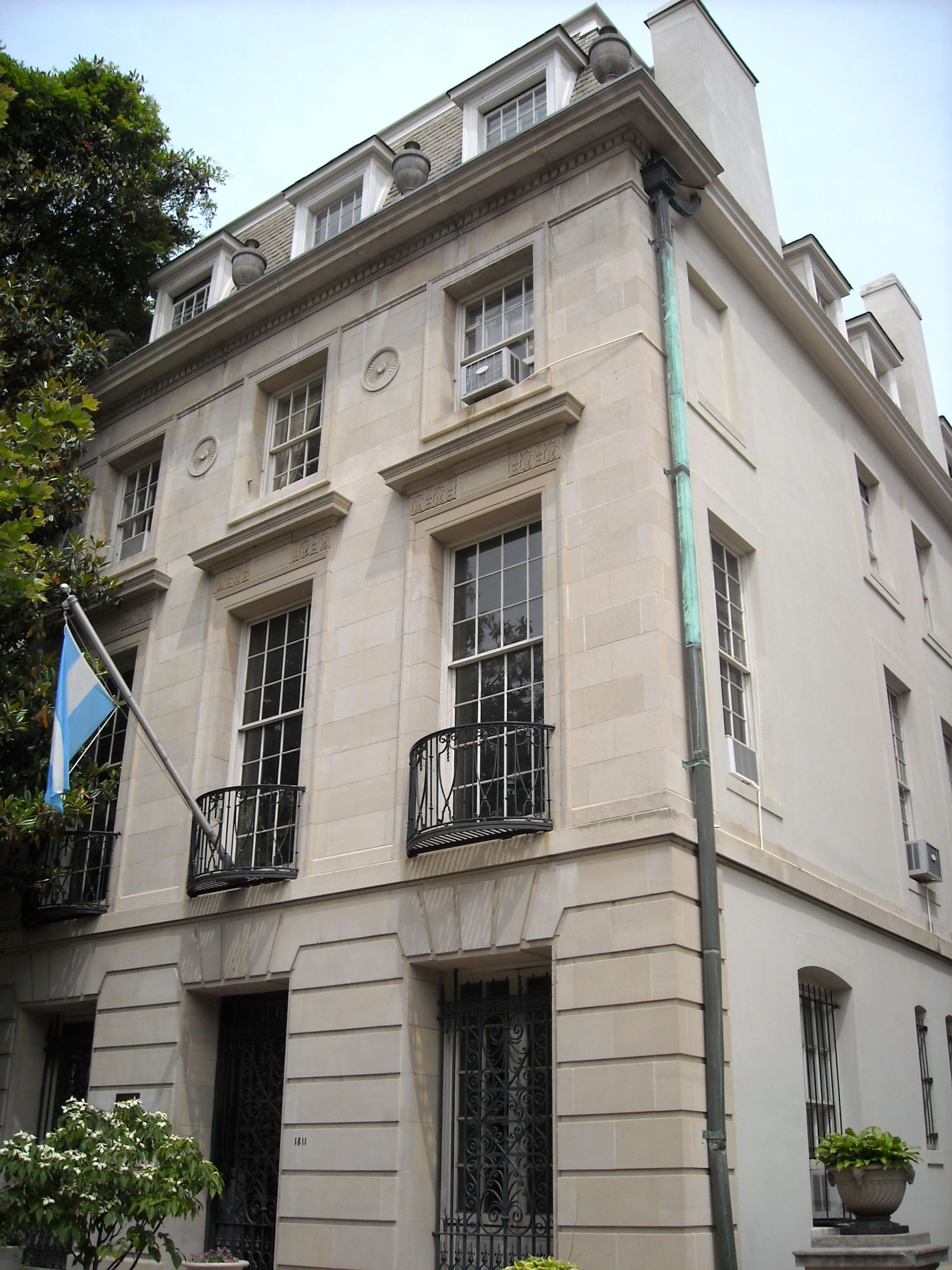
Consular Section in Washington, D.C.

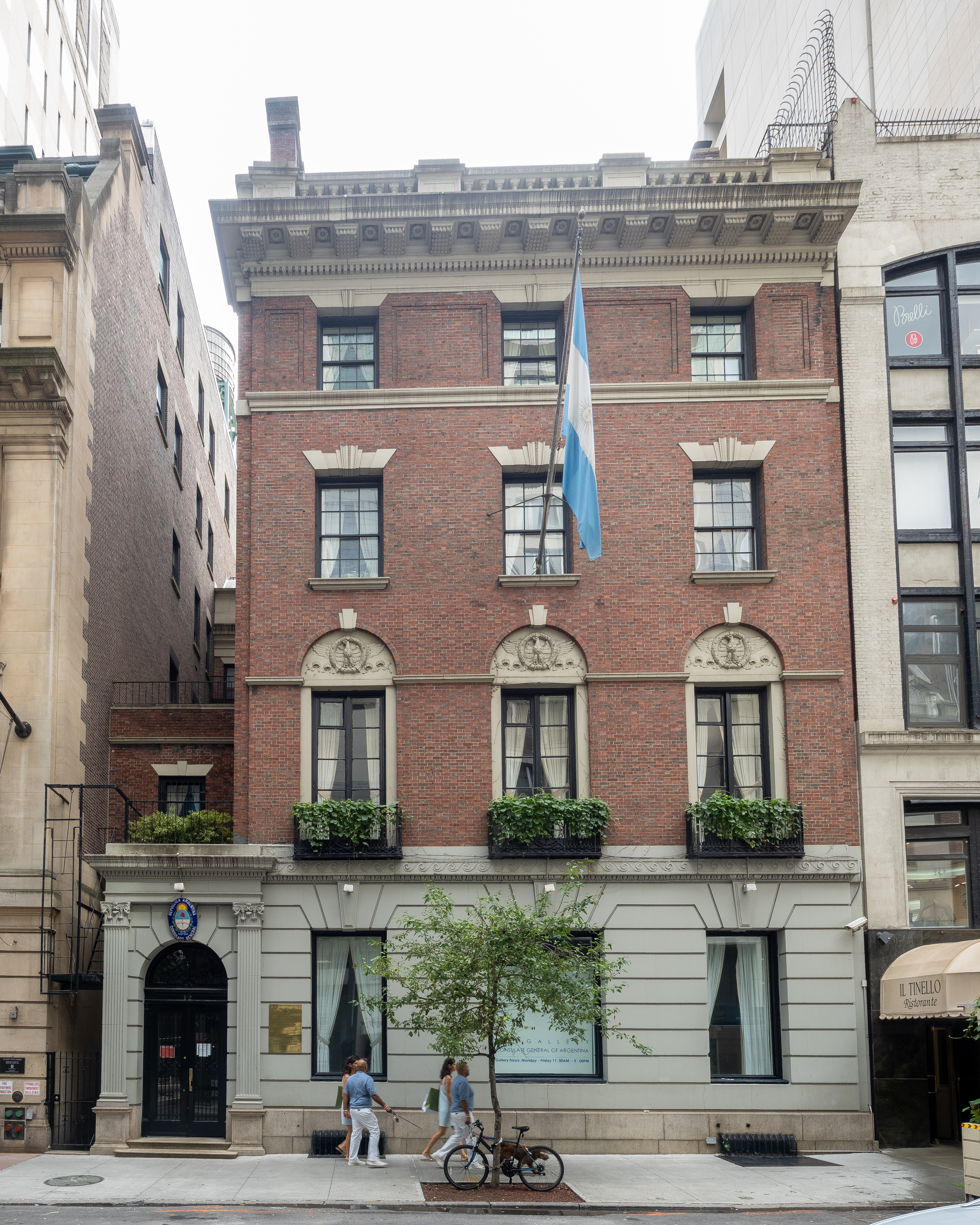
Consulate-General in New York City

=== Asia ===
| Host country | Host city | Mission | Concurrent accreditation | Ref. |
|---|---|---|---|---|
| Armenia | Yerevan | Embassy | | |
| Azerbaijan | Baku | Embassy | | |
| Bangladesh | Dhaka | Embassy | | |
| China | Beijing | Embassy | Countries: Mongolia | |
| China | Guangzhou | Consulate-General | Countries: Mongolia | |
| China | Hong Kong | Consulate-General | Countries: Mongolia | |
| China | Shanghai | Consulate-General | Countries: Mongolia | |
| India | New Delhi | Embassy | Countries: Bhutan; Maldives; Nepal; Sri Lanka | |
| India | Mumbai | Consulate-General | Countries: Bhutan; Maldives; Nepal; Sri Lanka | |
| Indonesia | Jakarta | Embassy | Countries: Timor-Leste; Multilateral Organizations: Association of Southeast Asian Nations | |
| Iran | Tehran | Embassy | | |
| Israel | Tel Aviv | Embassy | Countries: Cyprus | |
| Israel | Tel Aviv | Consulate-General | Countries: Cyprus | |
| Japan | Tokyo | Embassy | Countries: Marshall Islands; Micronesia | |
| Kuwait | Kuwait City | Embassy | | |
| Lebanon | Beirut | Embassy | | |
| Malaysia | Kuala Lumpur | Embassy | Countries: Brunei | |
| Pakistan | Islamabad | Embassy | Countries: Afghanistan; Tajikistan | |
| Palestine | Ramallah | Representative Office | | |
| Philippines | Manila | Embassy | Countries: Palau | |
| Qatar | Doha | Embassy | | |
| Saudi Arabia | Riyadh | Embassy | Countries: Bahrain; Oman; Yemen | |
| Singapore | Singapore | Embassy | | |
| South Korea | Seoul | Embassy | | |
| Syria | Damascus | Embassy | Countries: Jordan | |
| Taiwan | Taipei | Trade and Cultural Office | | |
| Thailand | Bangkok | Embassy | Countries: Cambodia; Laos; Myanmar | |
| Turkey | Ankara | Embassy | Countries: Georgia | |
| Turkey | Istanbul | Consulate-General | Countries: Georgia | |
| United Arab Emirates | Abu Dhabi | Embassy | | |
| Vietnam | Hanoi | Embassy | | |

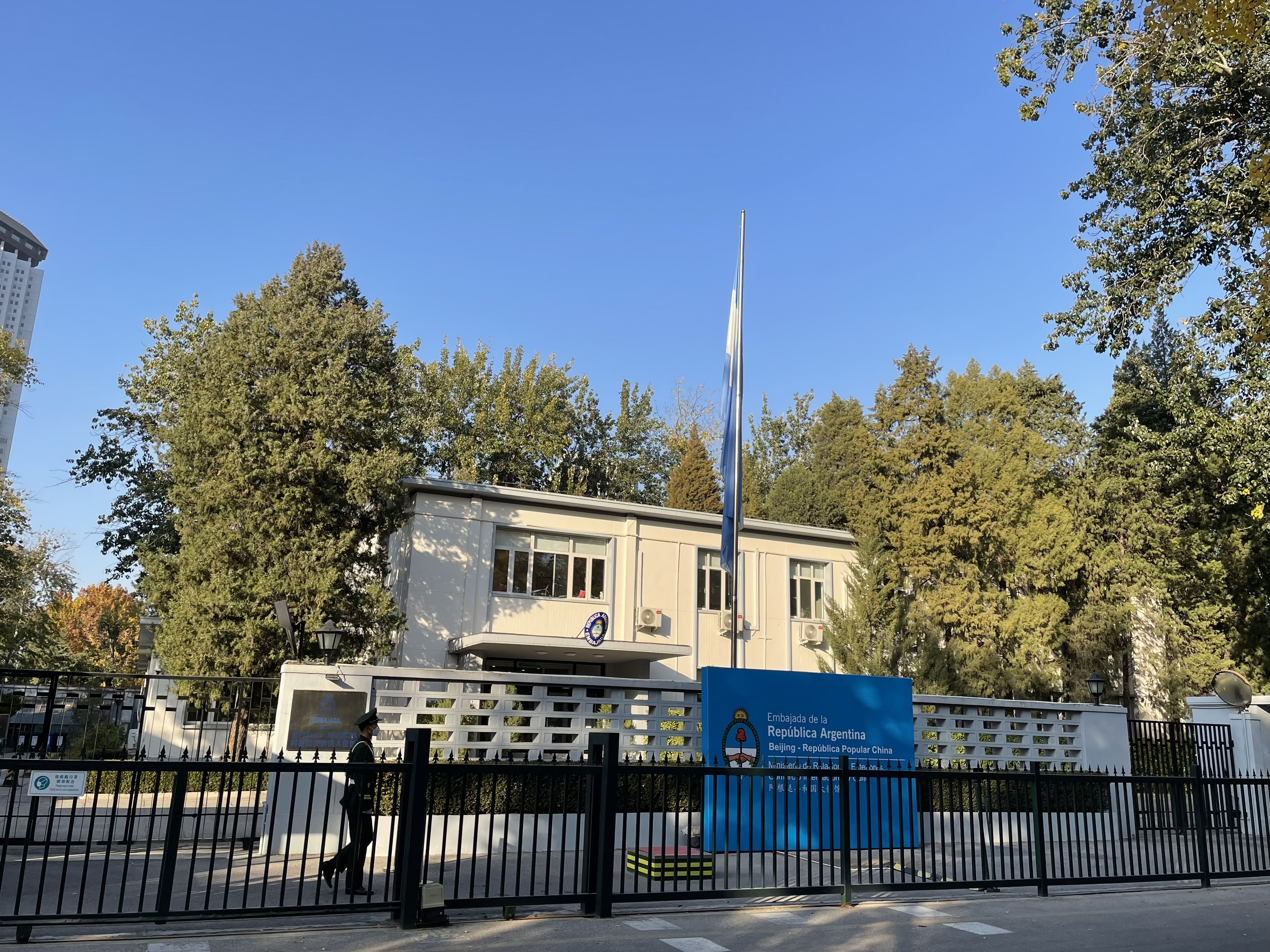
Embassy in Beijing

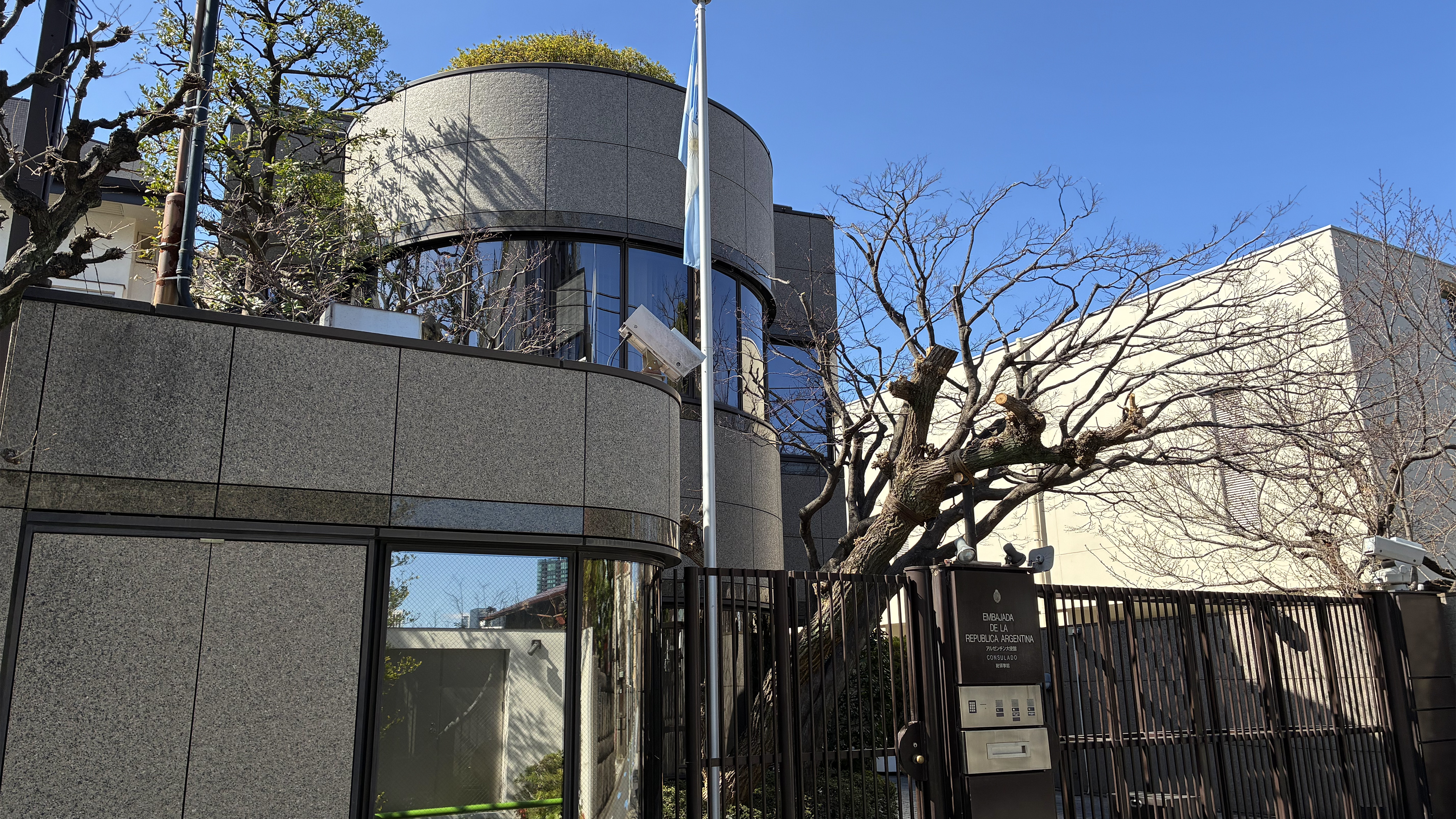
Embassy in Tokyo

=== Europe ===
| Host country | Host city | Mission | Concurrent accreditation | Ref. |
|---|---|---|---|---|
| Austria | Vienna | Embassy | Countries: Slovakia; Slovenia; Multilateral Organizations: United Nations; International Atomic Energy Agency; United Nations Industrial Development Organization; United Nations Office on Drugs and Crime | |
| Belgium | Brussels | Embassy | Countries: Luxembourg; Multilateral Organizations: European Union | |
| Bulgaria | Sofia | Embassy | Countries: North Macedonia | |
| Czechia | Prague | Embassy | | |
| Denmark | Copenhagen | Embassy | | |
| Finland | Helsinki | Embassy | Countries: Estonia; Latvia | |
| France | Paris | Embassy | Countries: Monaco | |
| Germany | Berlin | Embassy | | |
| Germany | Frankfurt | Consulate-General | | |
| Germany | Hamburg | Consulate-General | | |
| Germany | Bonn | Consulate | | |
| Greece | Athens | Embassy | | |
| Holy See | Rome (Note: The Argentine Embassy to the Holy See is located outside Vatican territory in Rome.) | Embassy | Sovereign Entity: Sovereign Military Order of Malta | |
| Hungary | Budapest | Embassy | Countries: Bosnia and Herzegovina; Croatia | |
| Ireland | Dublin | Embassy | | |
| Italy | Rome | Embassy | Countries: Albania; Malta; San Marino; Multilateral Organizations: Food and Agriculture Organization; International Fund for Agricultural Development; World Food Programme | |
| Italy | Rome | Consulate-General | Countries: Albania; Malta; San Marino; Multilateral Organizations: Food and Agriculture Organization; International Fund for Agricultural Development; World Food Programme | |
| Italy | Milan | Consulate-General | Countries: Albania; Malta; San Marino; Multilateral Organizations: Food and Agriculture Organization; International Fund for Agricultural Development; World Food Programme | |
| Netherlands | The Hague | Embassy | Multilateral Organizations: Organisation for the Prohibition of Chemical Weapons | |
| Norway | Oslo | Embassy | Countries: Iceland | |
| Poland | Warsaw | Embassy | Countries: Lithuania | |
| Portugal | Lisbon | Embassy | Countries: Cape Verde | |
| Romania | Bucharest | Embassy | Countries: Moldova | |
| Russia | Moscow | Embassy | Countries: Belarus; Kazakhstan; Kyrgyzstan; Turkmenistan; Uzbekistan | |
| Serbia | Belgrade | Embassy | Countries: Montenegro | |
| Spain | Madrid | Embassy | Countries: Andorra | |
| Spain | Madrid | Consulate-General | Countries: Andorra | |
| Spain | Barcelona | Consulate-General | Countries: Andorra | |
| Spain | Vigo | Consulate-General | Countries: Andorra | |
| Spain | Cádiz | Consulate | Countries: Andorra | |
| Spain | Palma de Majorca | Consulate | Countries: Andorra | |
| Spain | Santa Cruz de Tenerife | Consulate | Countries: Andorra | |
| Sweden | Stockholm | Embassy | | |
| Switzerland | Bern | Embassy | Countries: Liechtenstein | |
| Ukraine | Kyiv | Embassy | | |
| United Kingdom | London | Embassy | Multilateral Organizations: International Maritime Organization | |
| United Kingdom | London | Consulate-General | Multilateral Organizations: International Maritime Organization | |

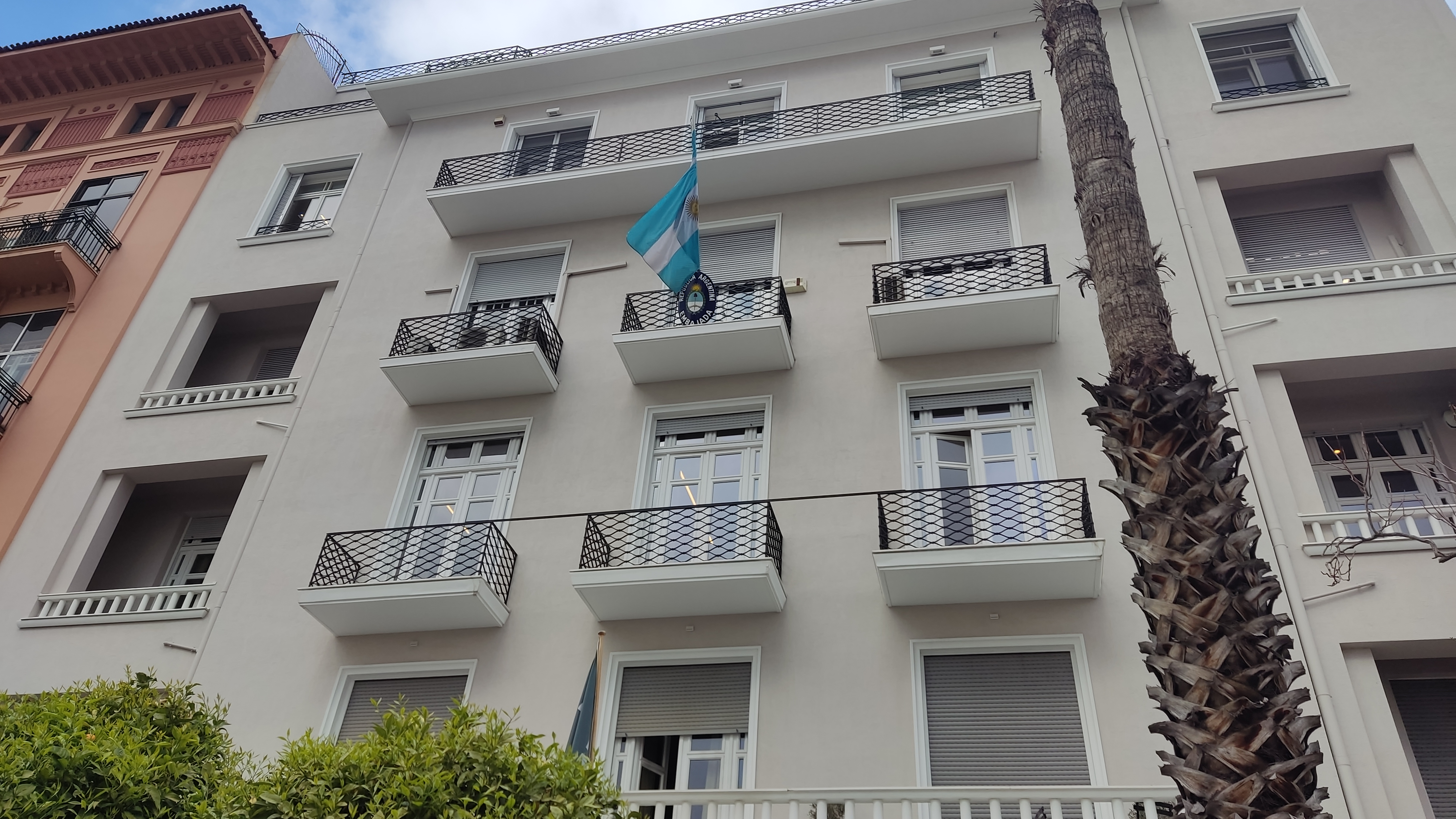
Embassy in Athens

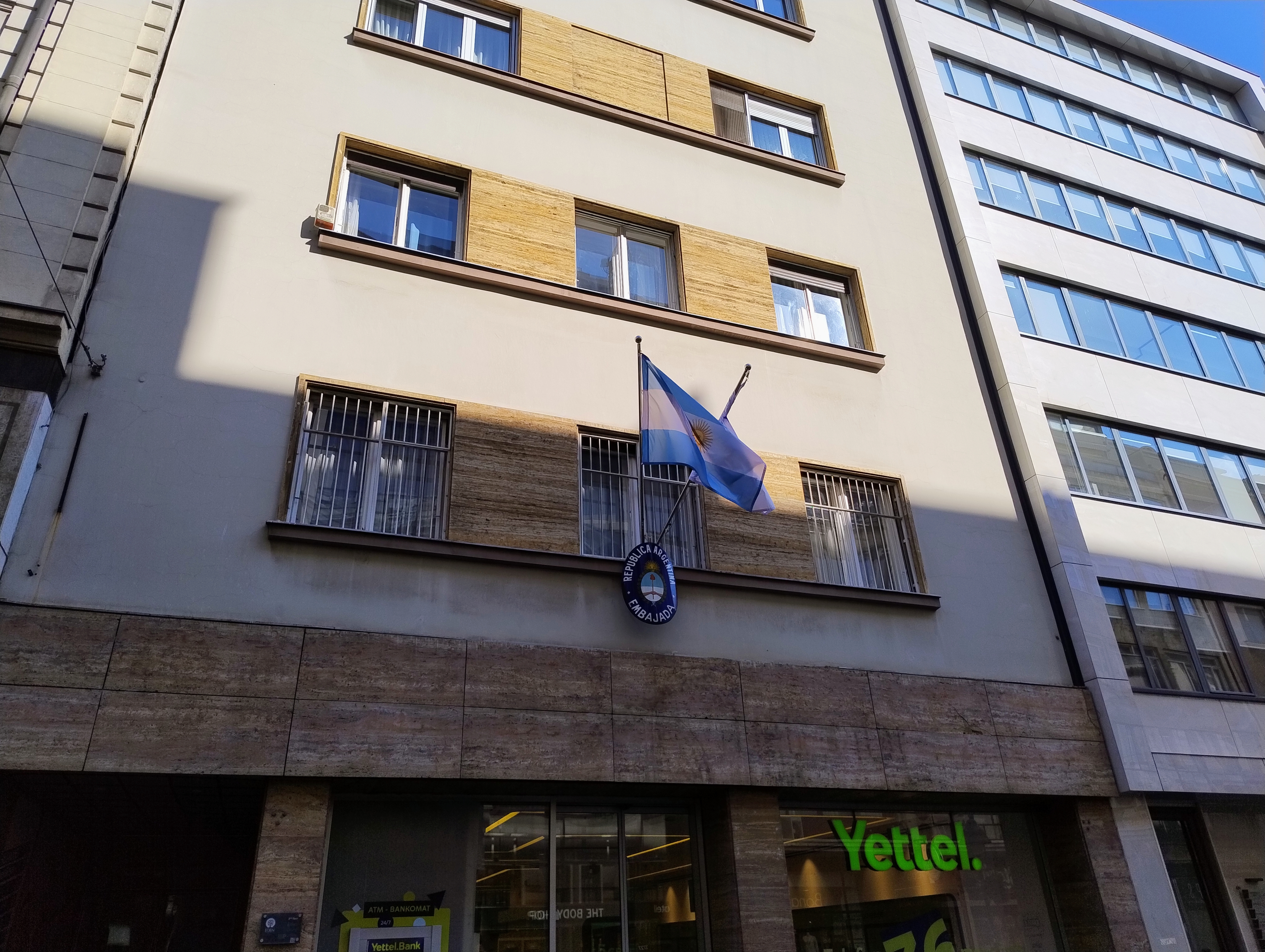
Embassy in Belgrade

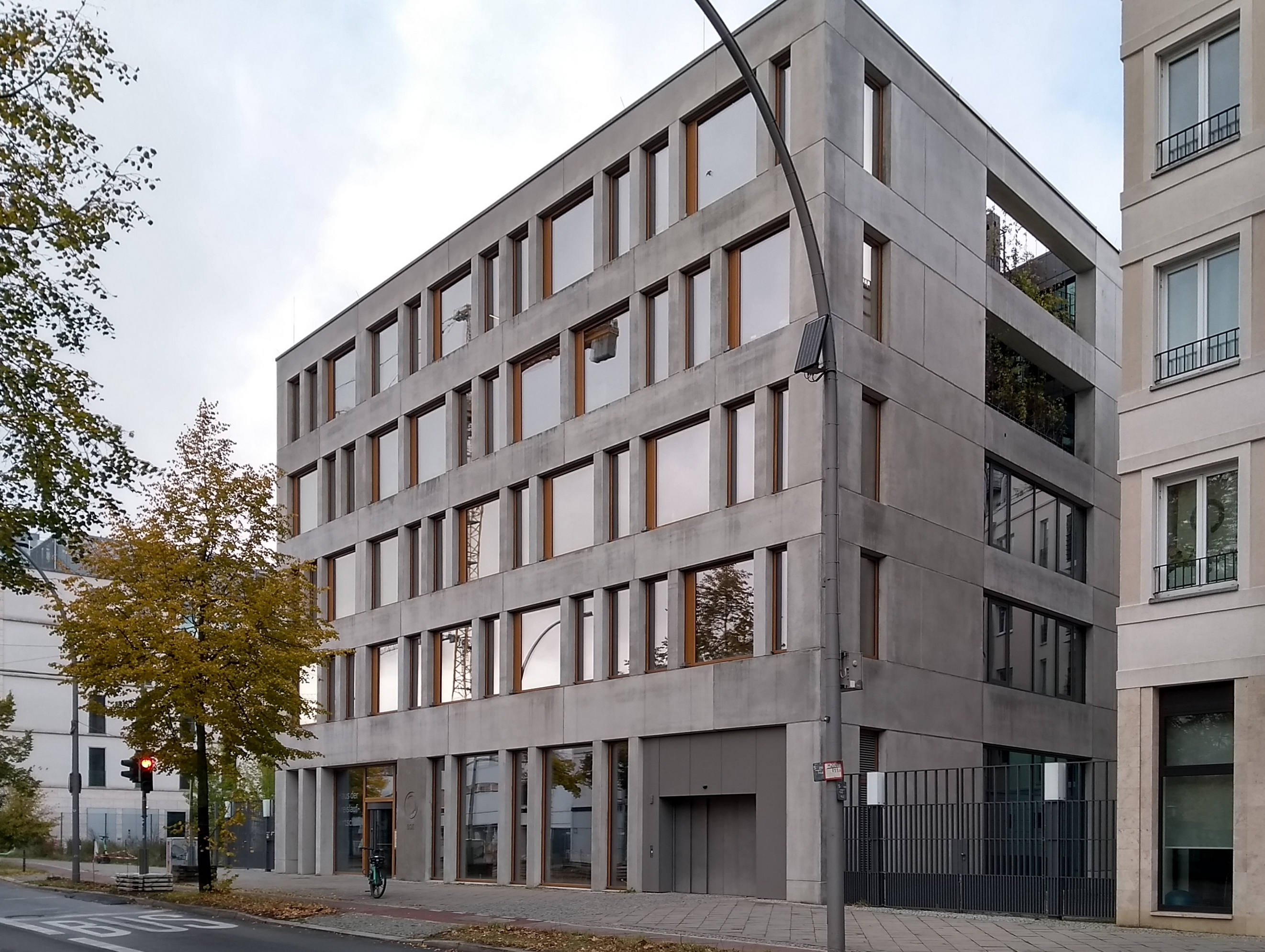
Embassy in Berlin

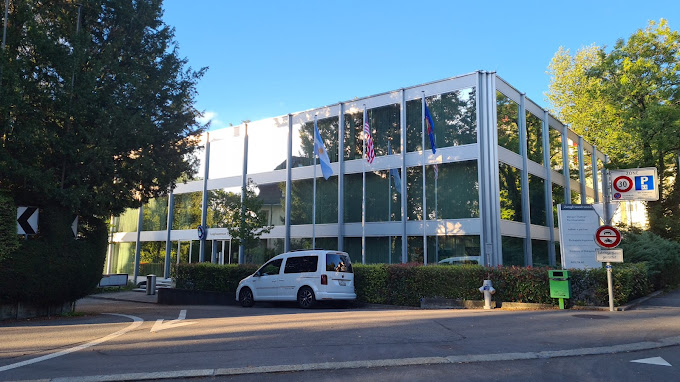
Embassy in Bern

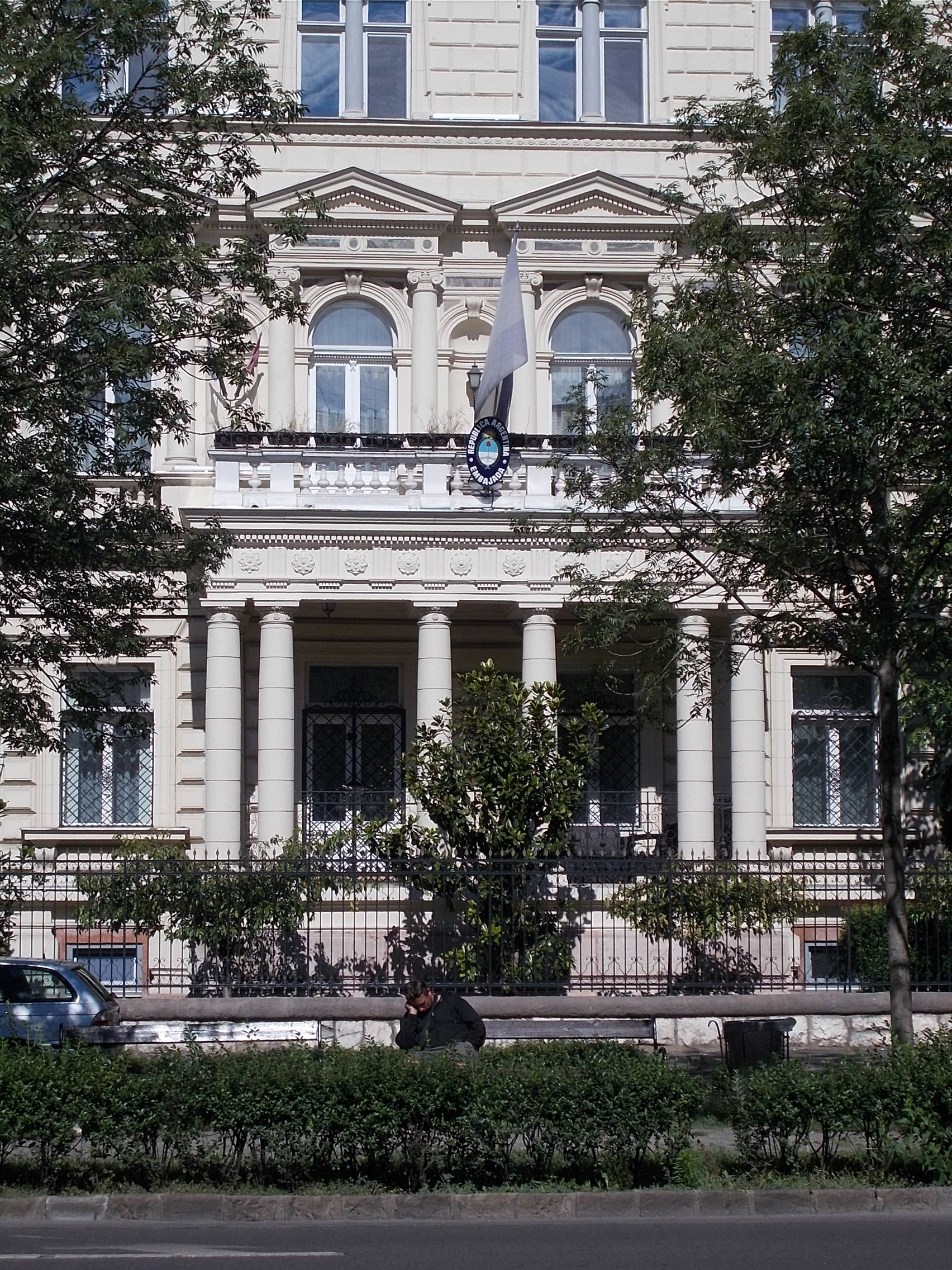
Embassy in Budapest

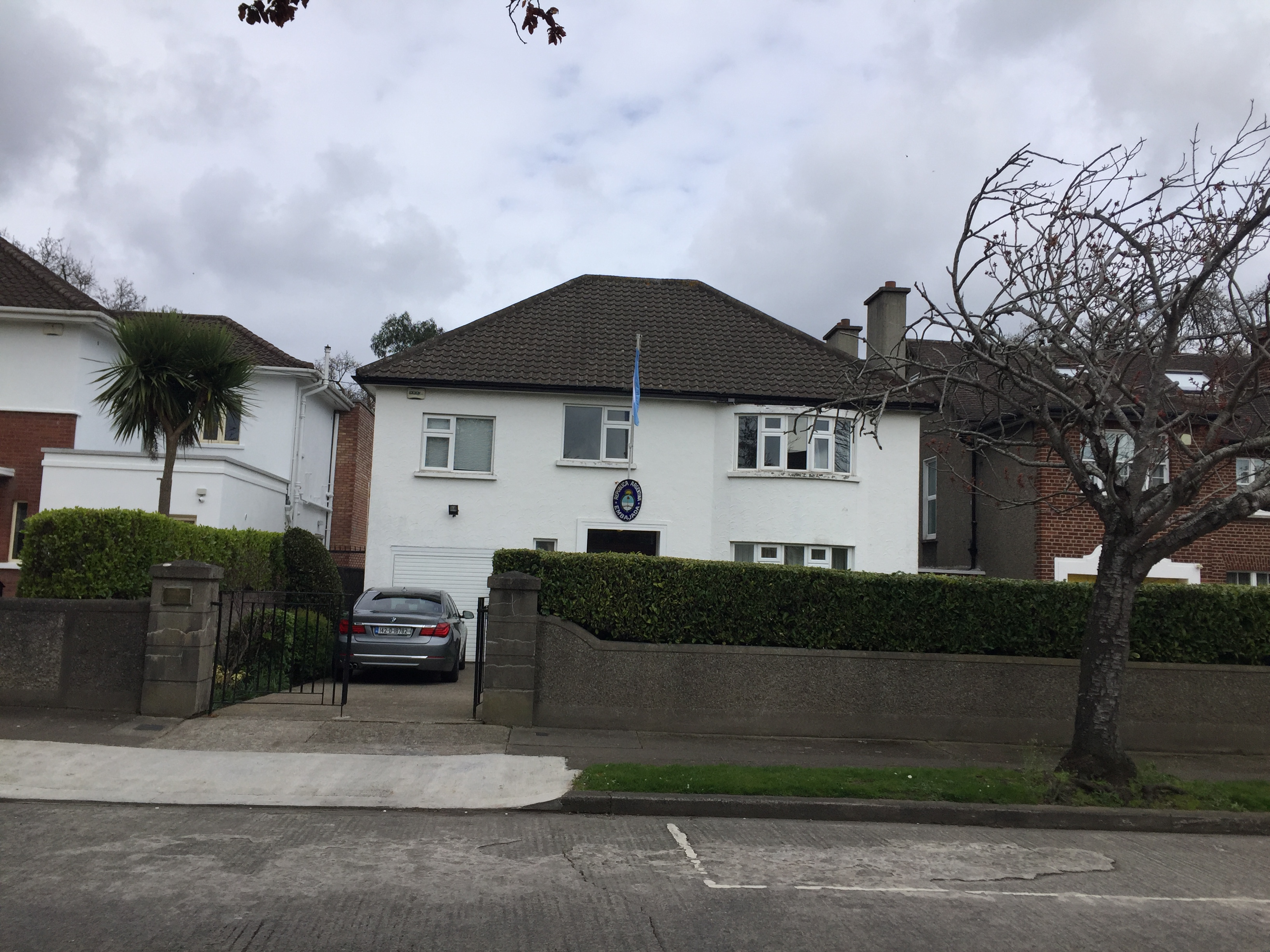
Embassy in Dublin

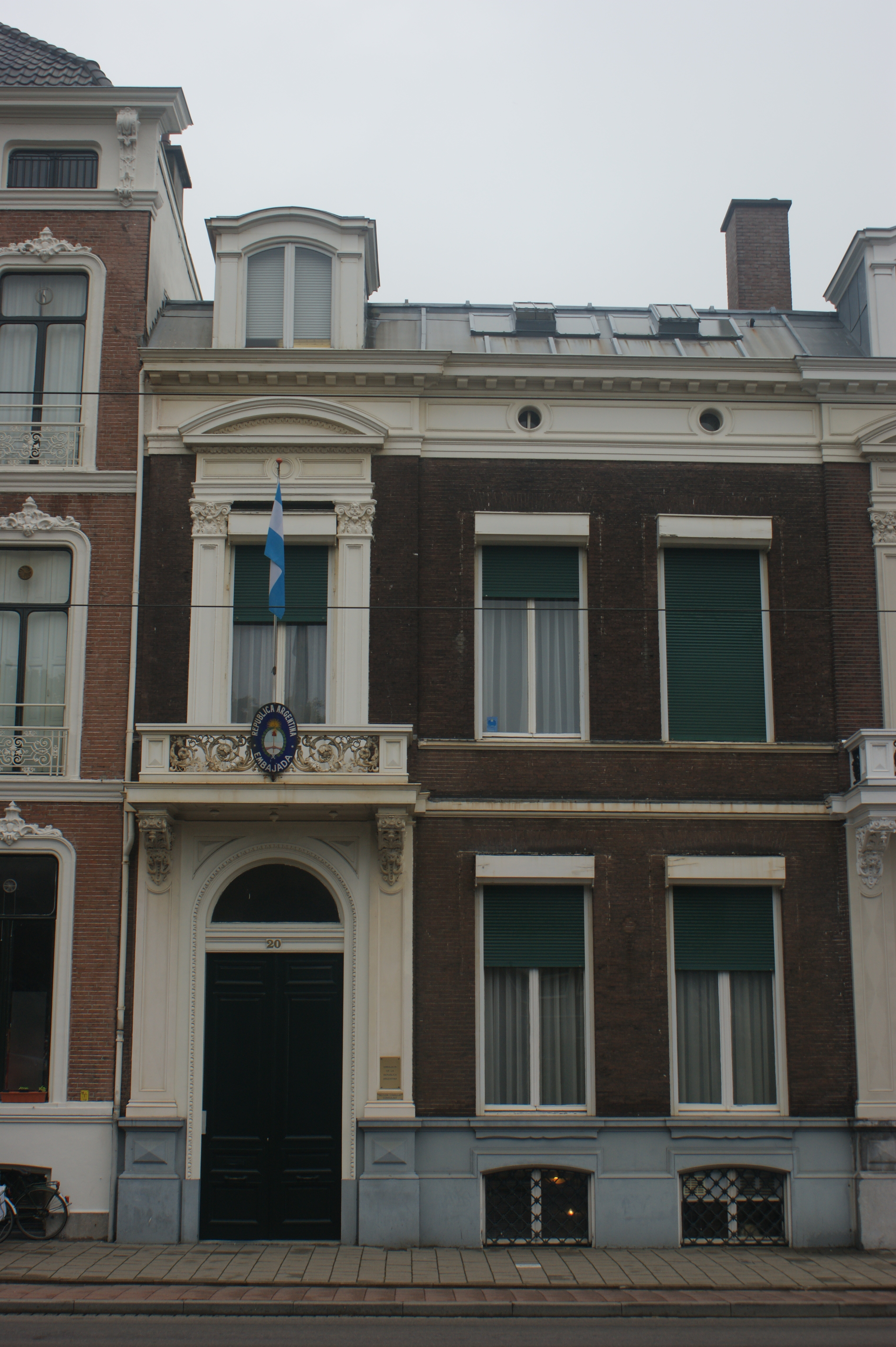
Embassy in The Hague

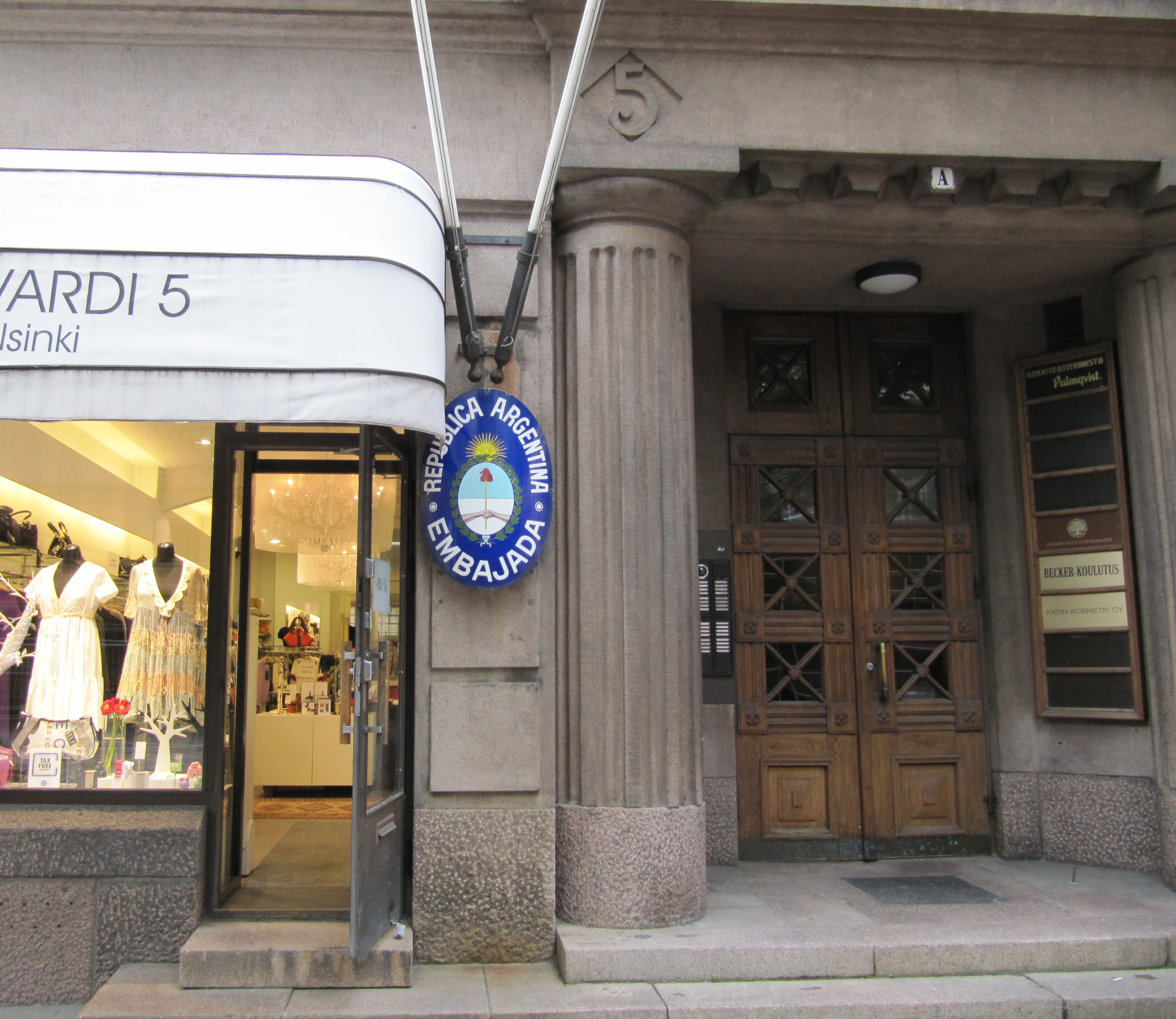
Embassy in Helsinki

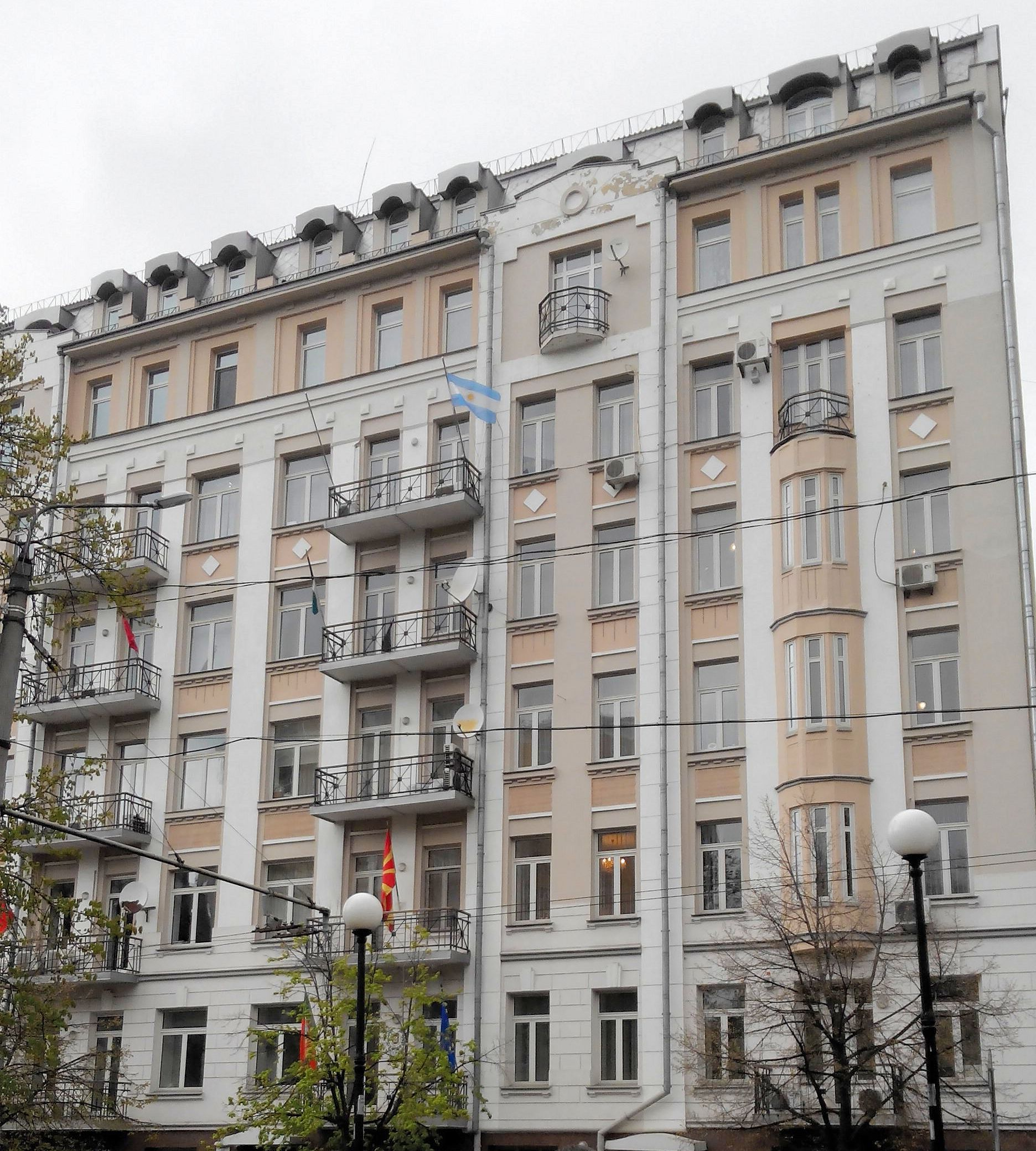
Building hosting the Embassy in Kyiv

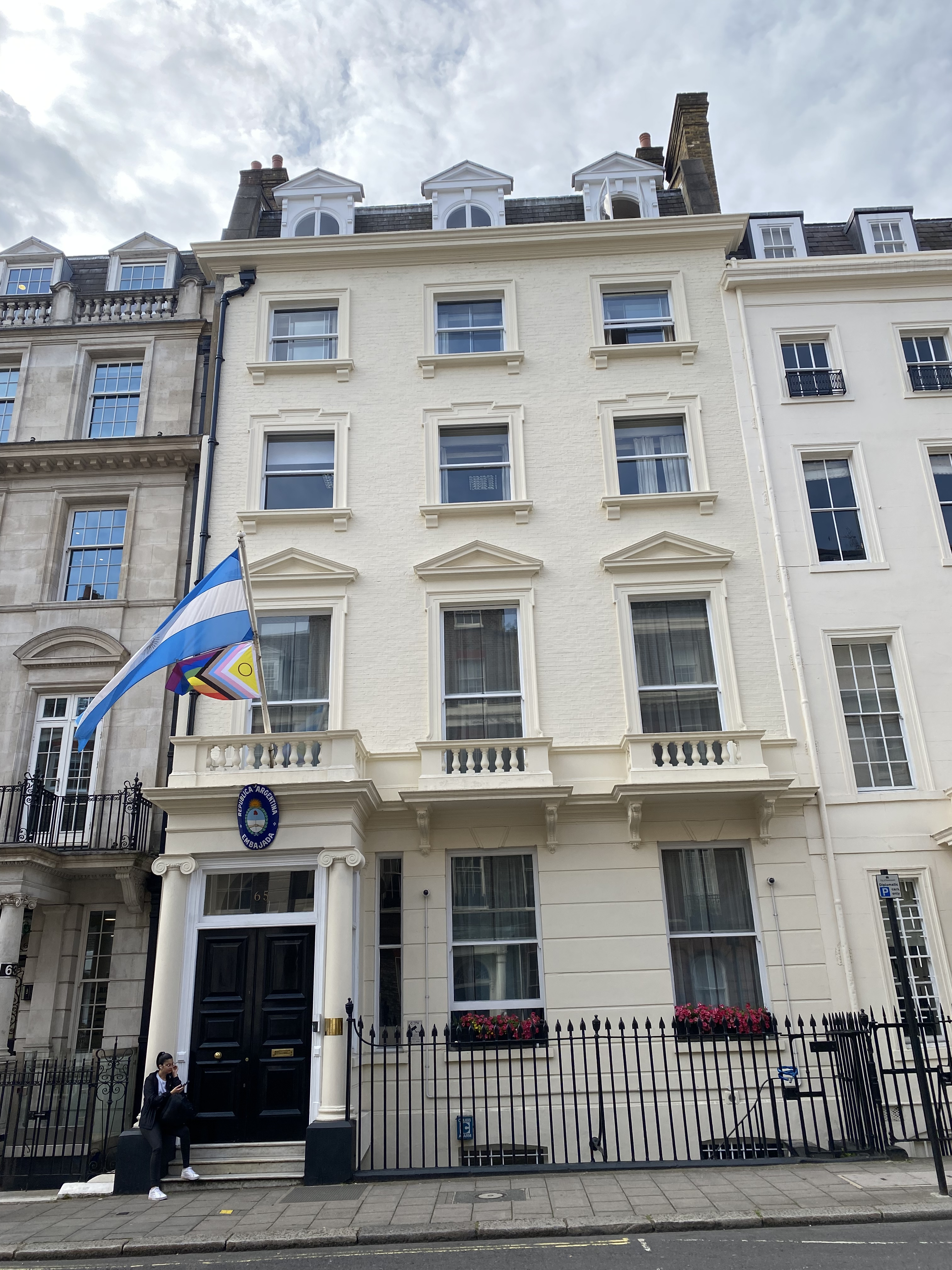
Embassy in London

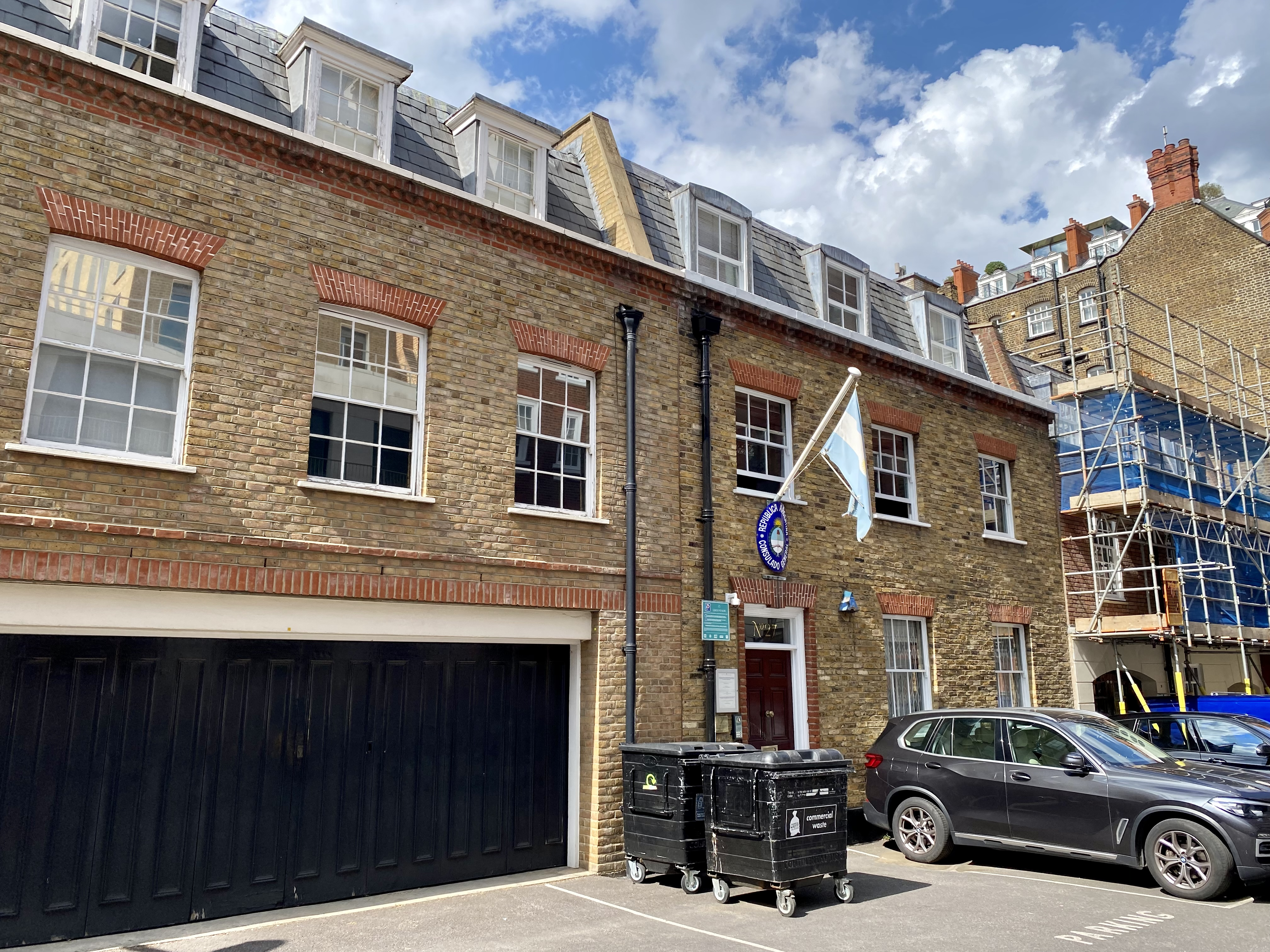
Consulate-General in London

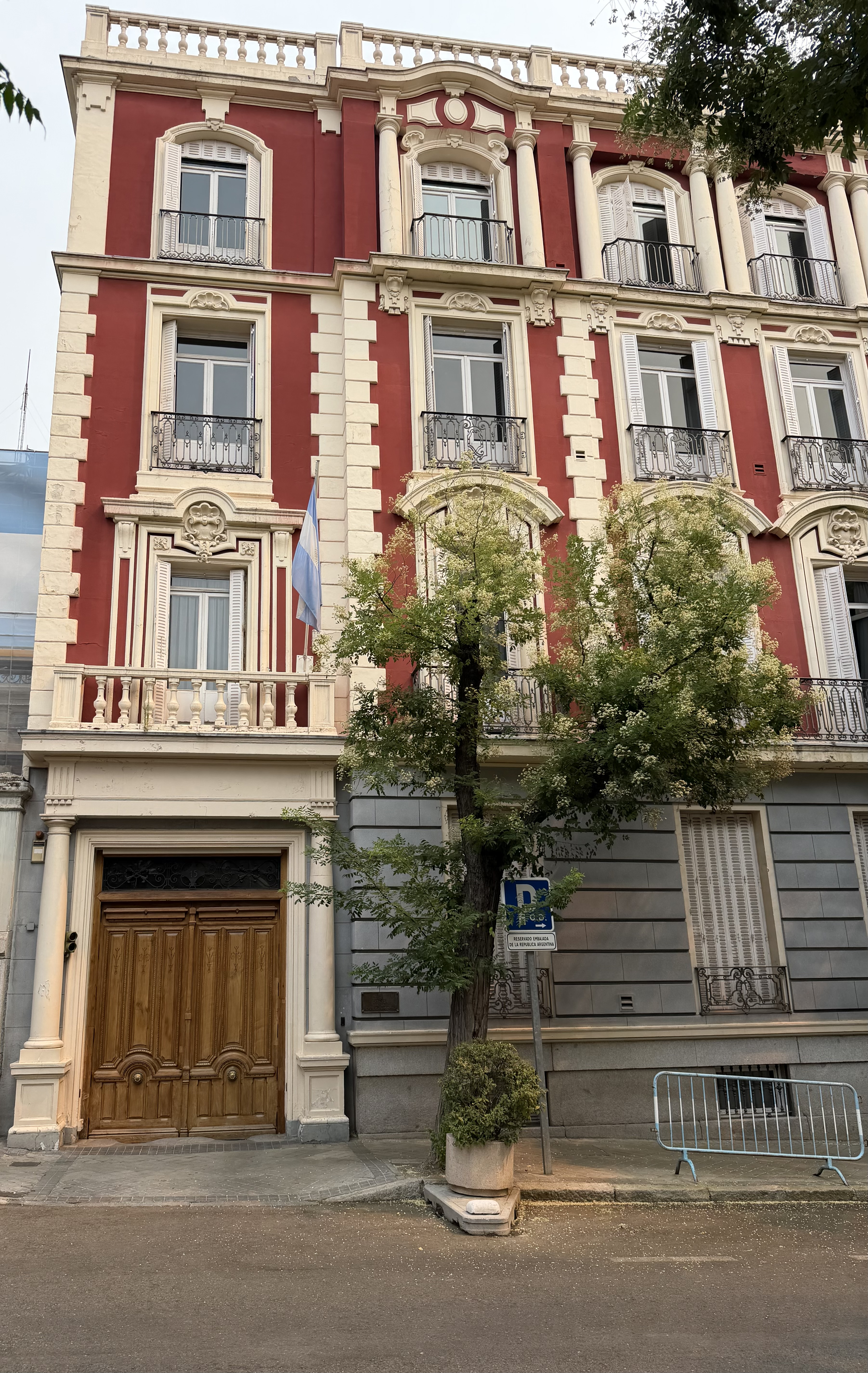
Embassy in Madrid

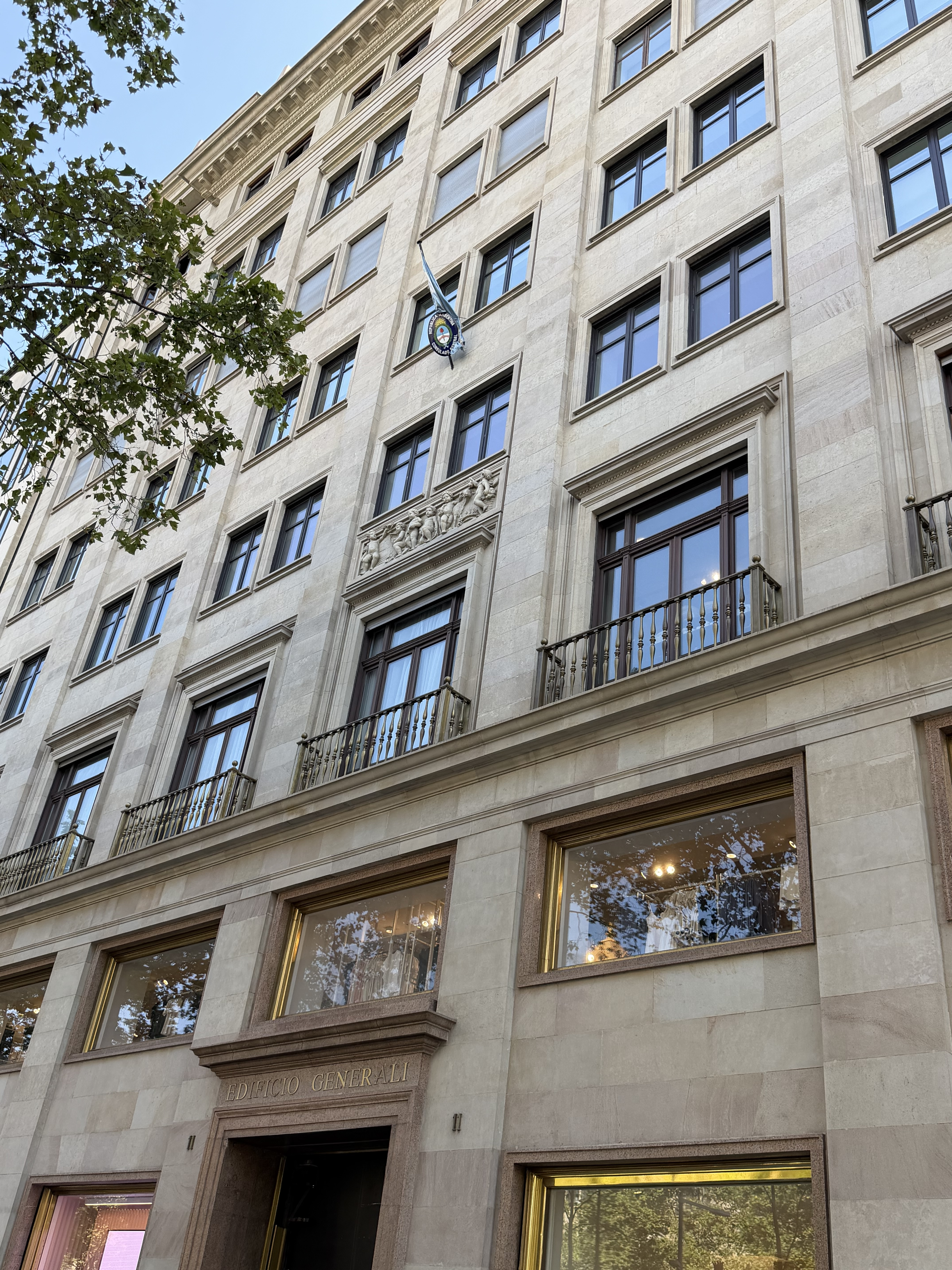
Consulate-General in Barcelona

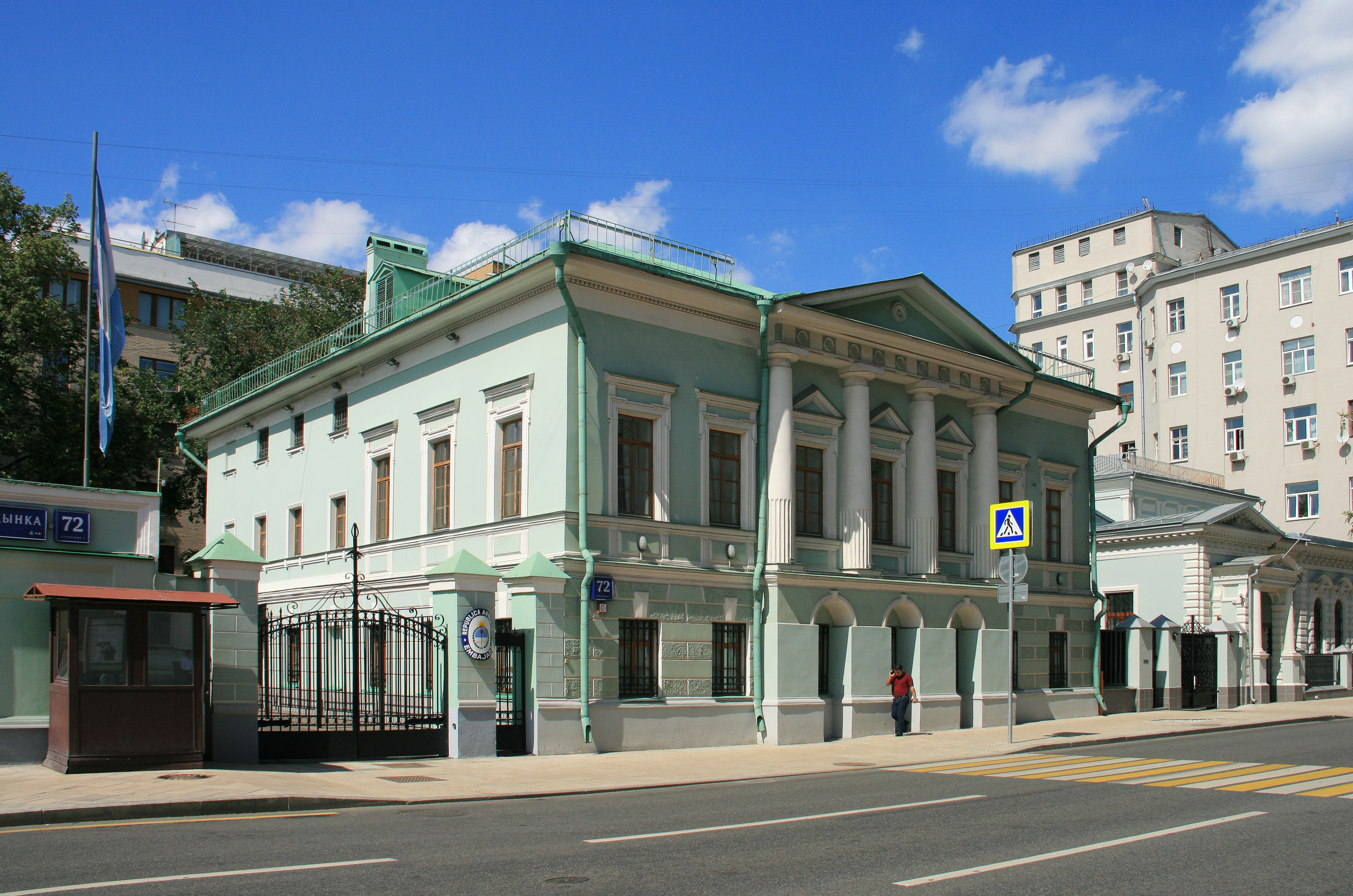
Embassy in Moscow

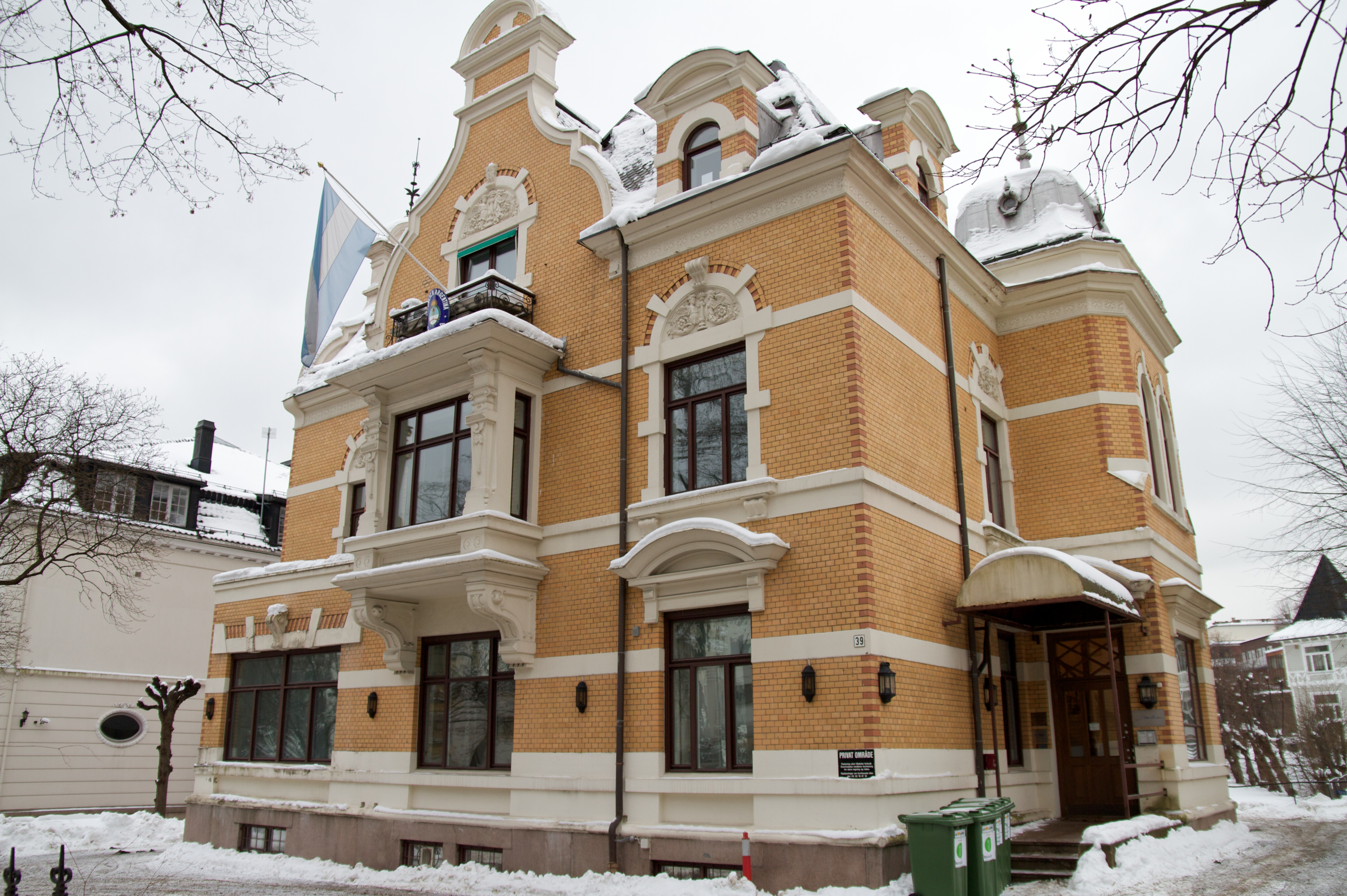
Embassy in Oslo

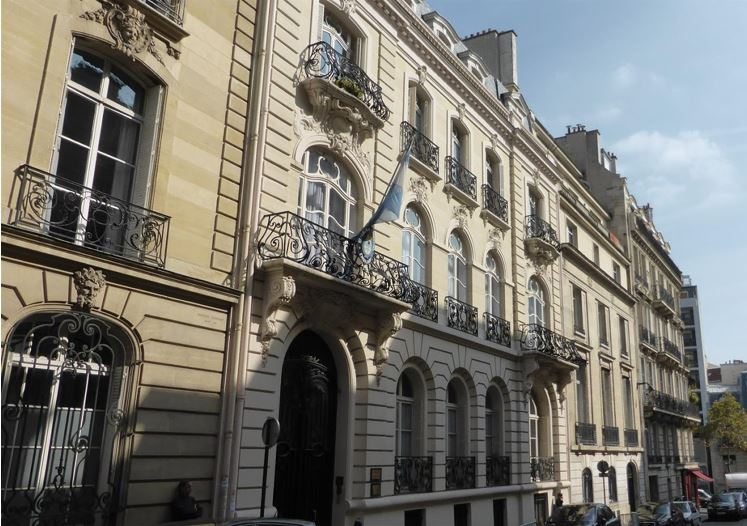
Embassy in Paris

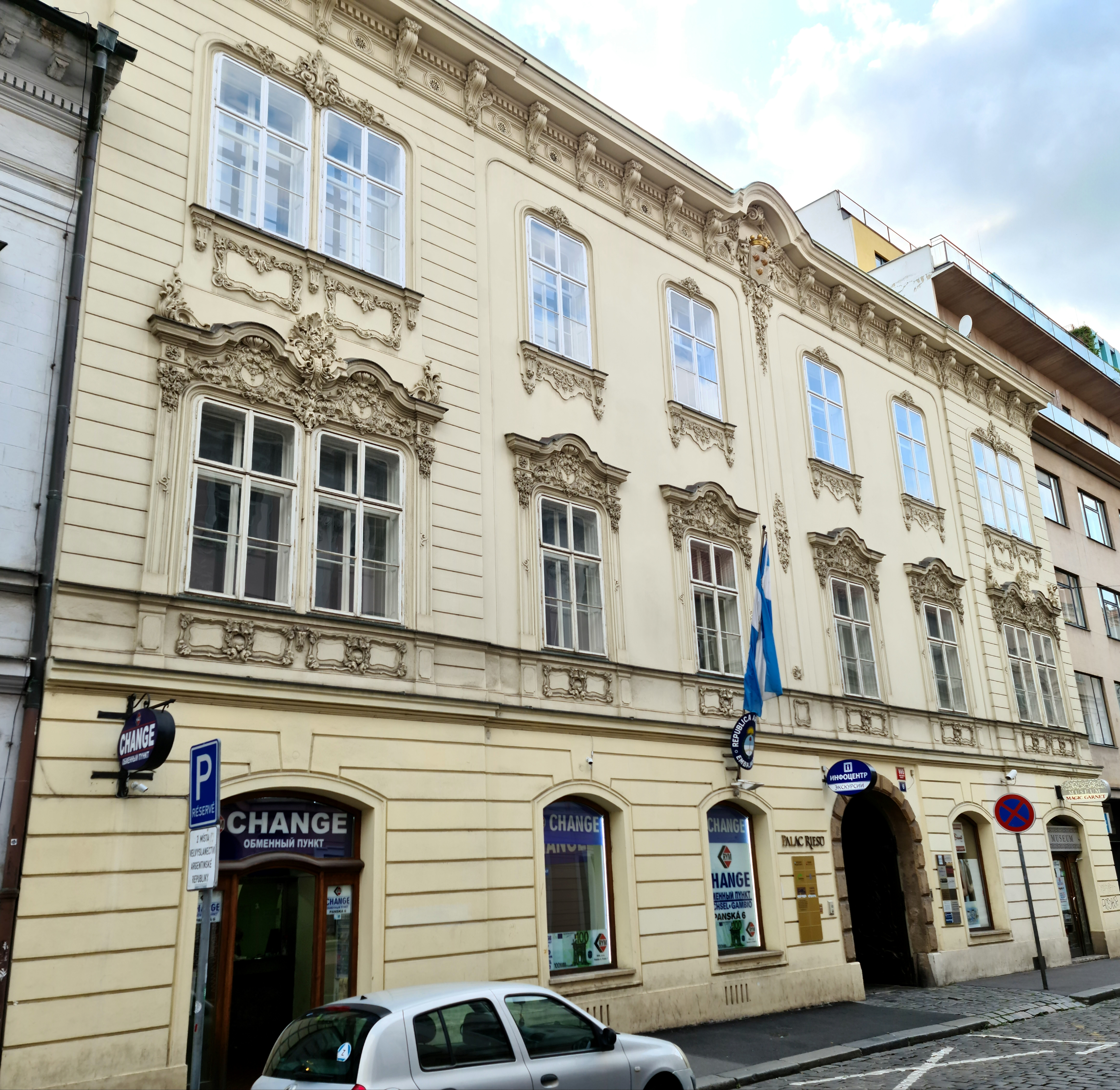
Embassy in Prague

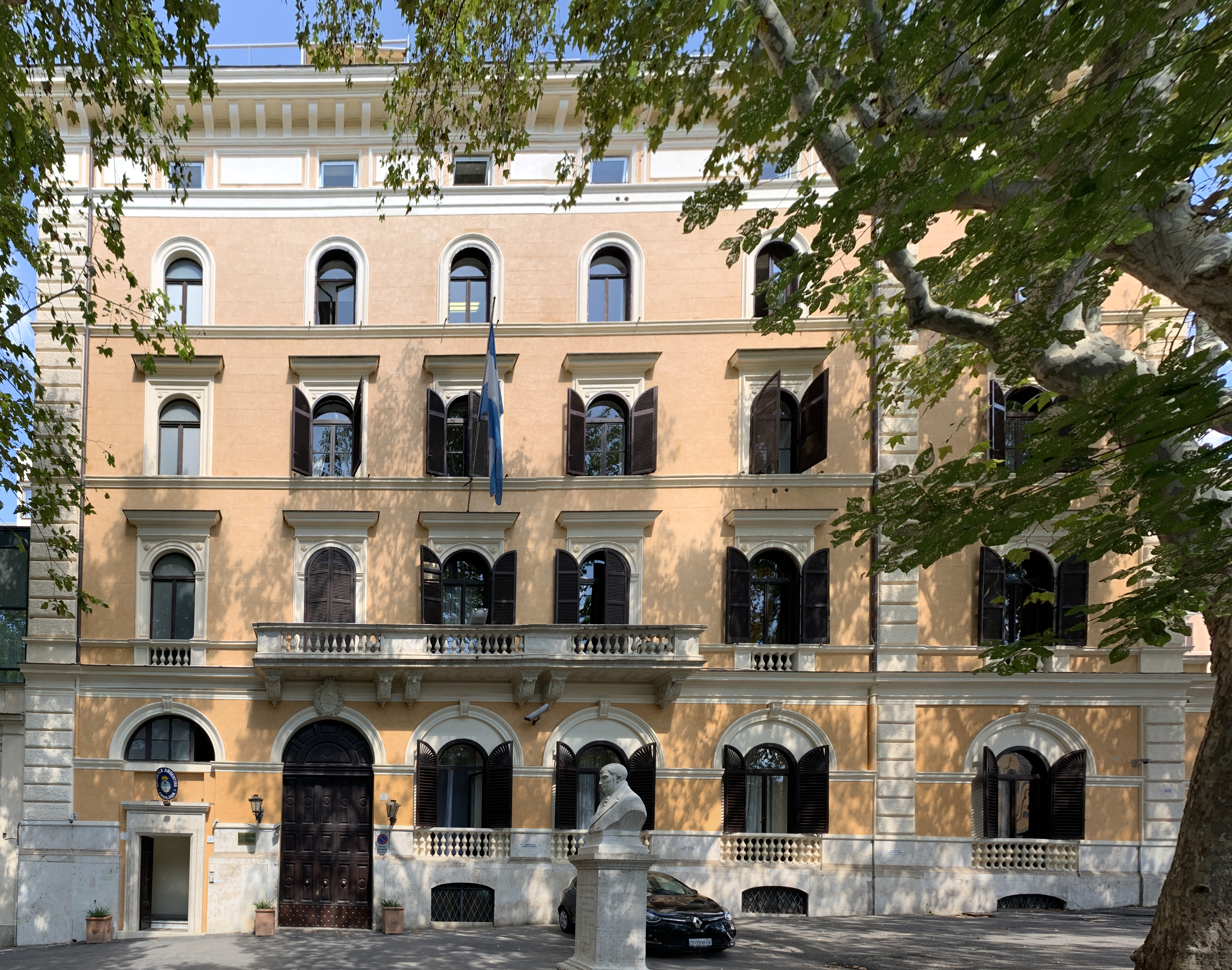
Embassy in Rome

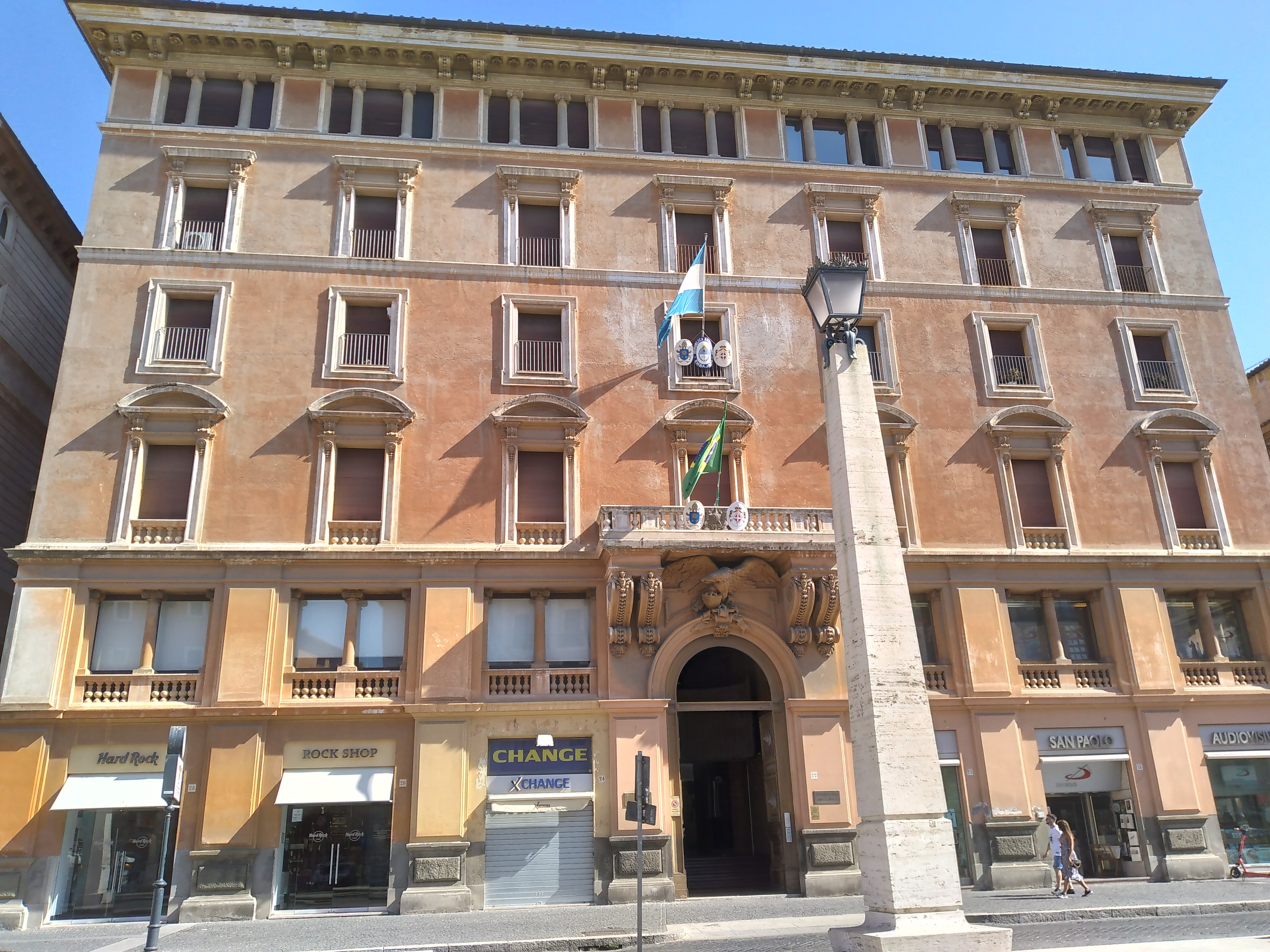
Building hosting the Embassy to the Holy See in Rome

Embassy in Sofia

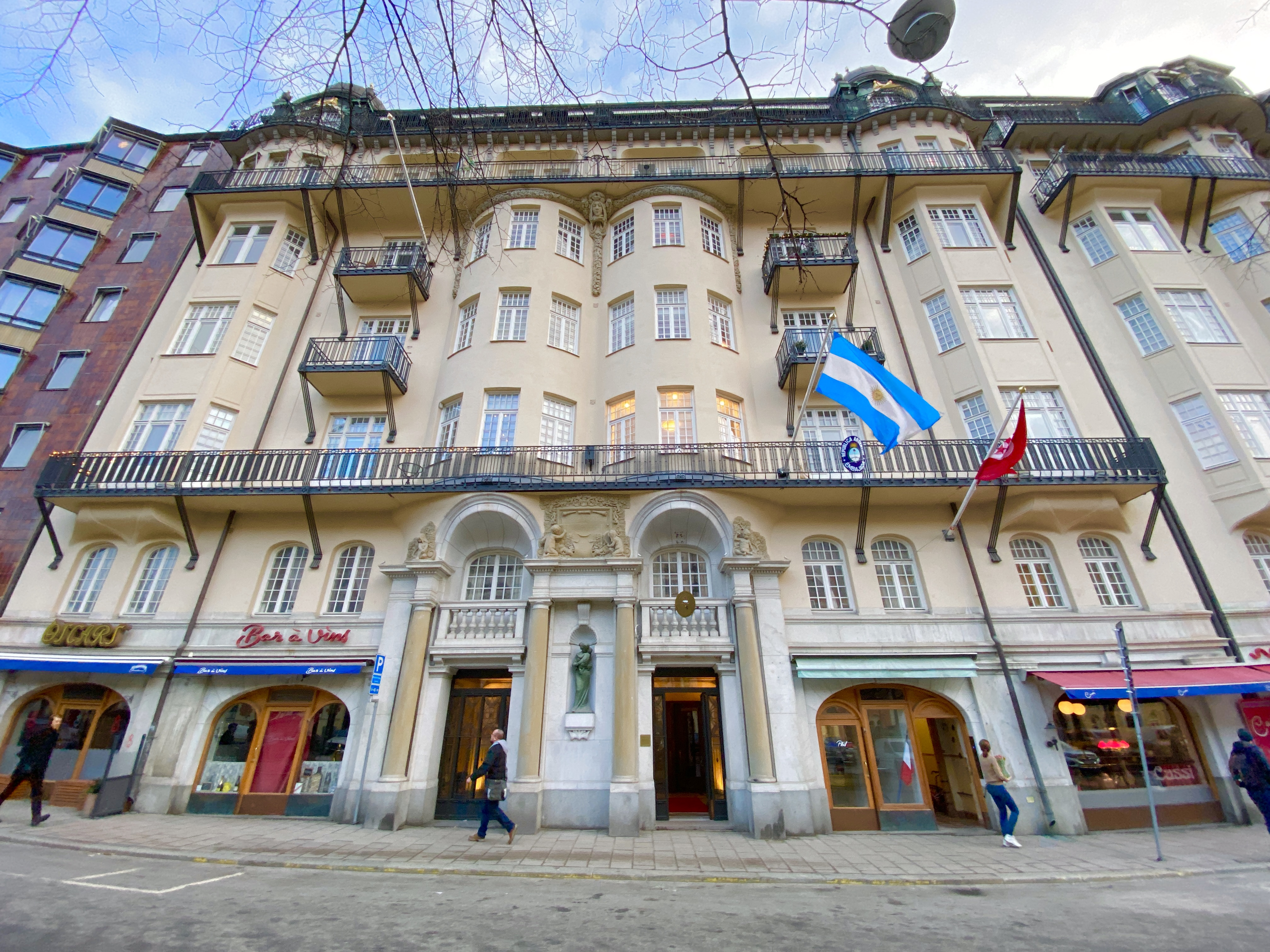
Building hosting the Embassy in Stockholm

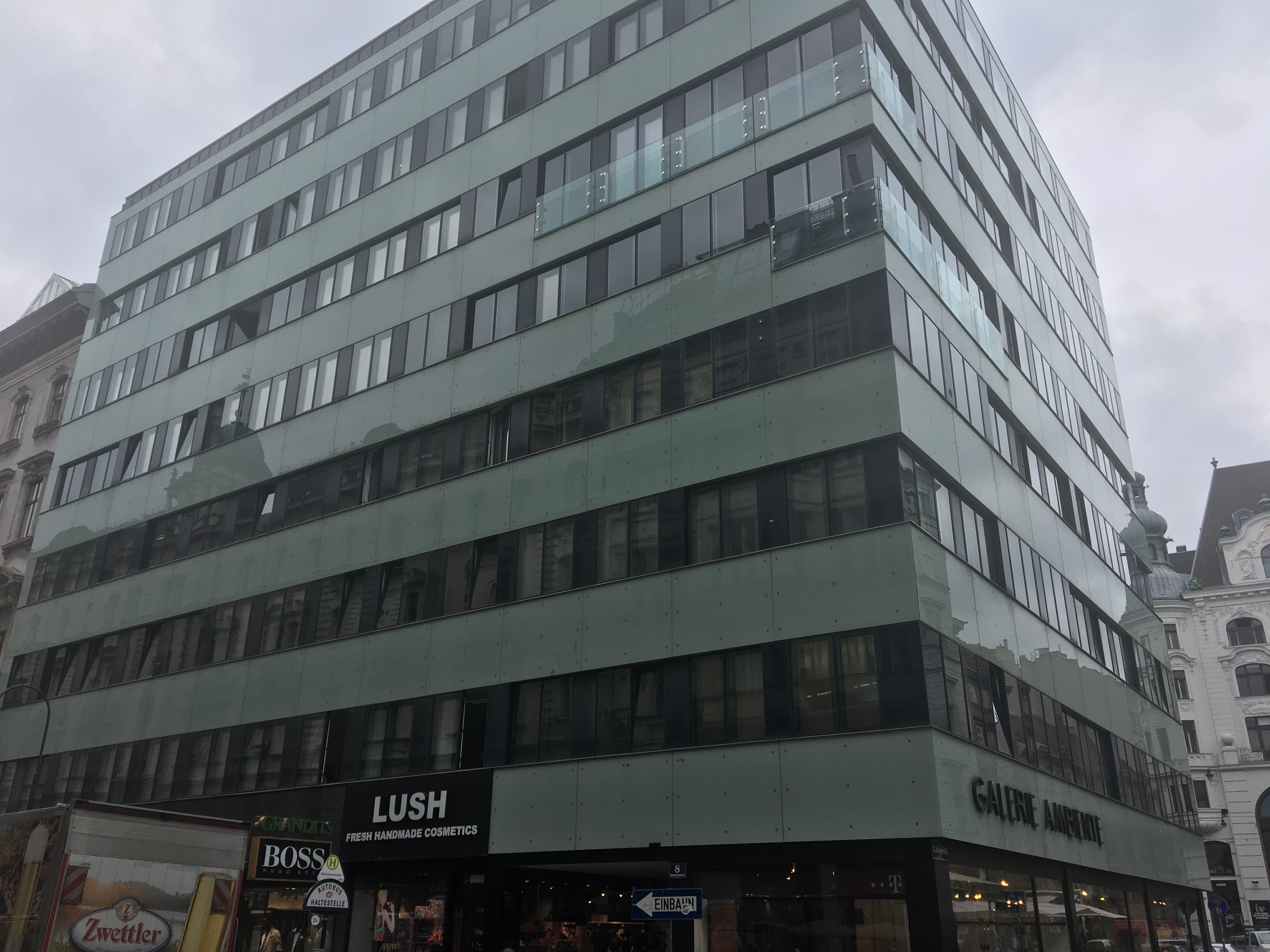
Building hosting the Embassy in Vienna

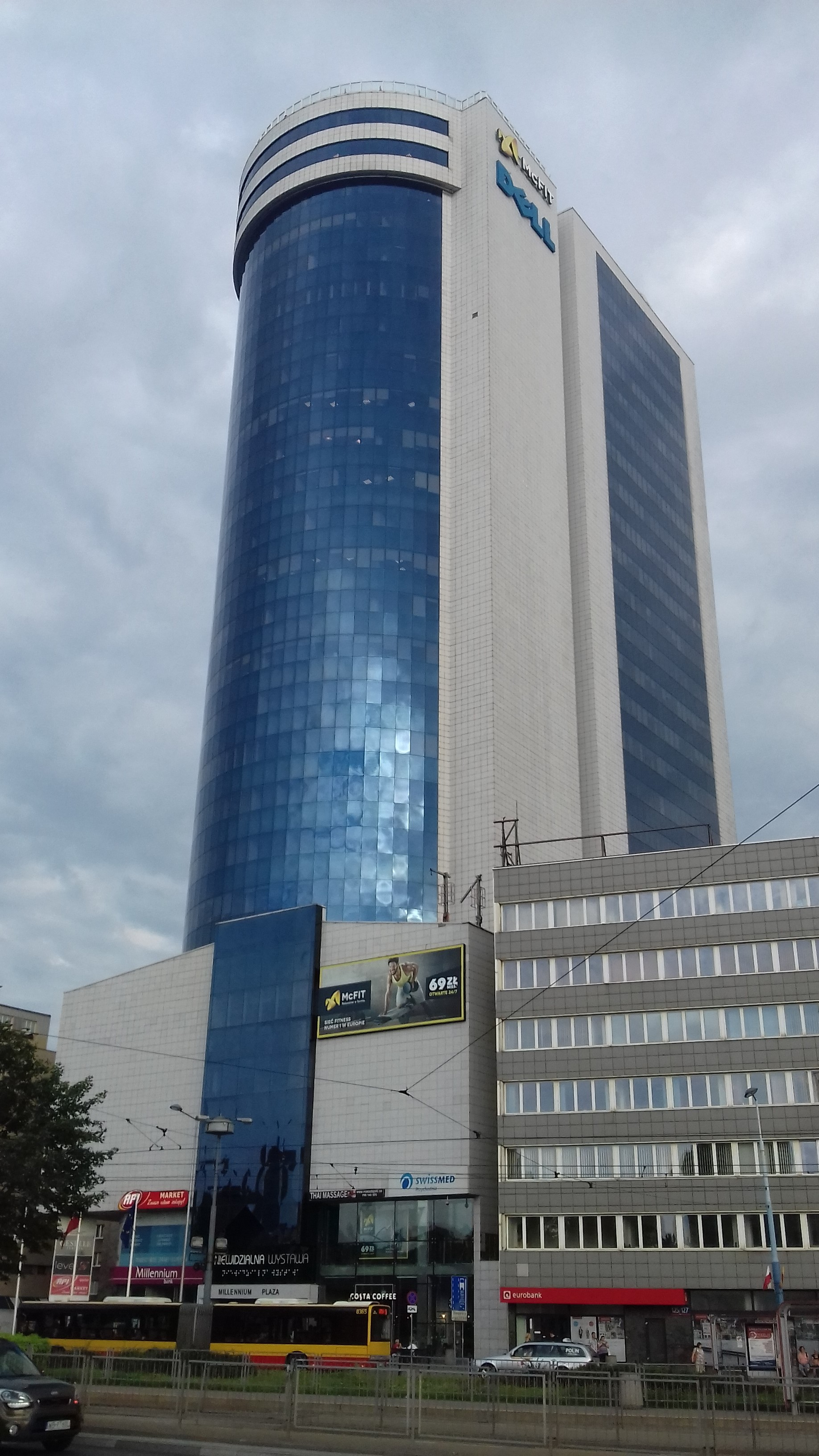
Building hosting the Embassy in Warsaw

=== Oceania ===
| Host country | Host city | Mission | Concurrent accreditation | Ref. |
|---|---|---|---|---|
| Australia | Canberra | Embassy | Countries: Fiji; Papua New Guinea; Solomon Islands; Vanuatu | |
| Australia | Sydney | Consulate-General | Countries: Fiji; Papua New Guinea; Solomon Islands; Vanuatu | |
| New Zealand | Wellington | Embassy | Countries: Samoa | |

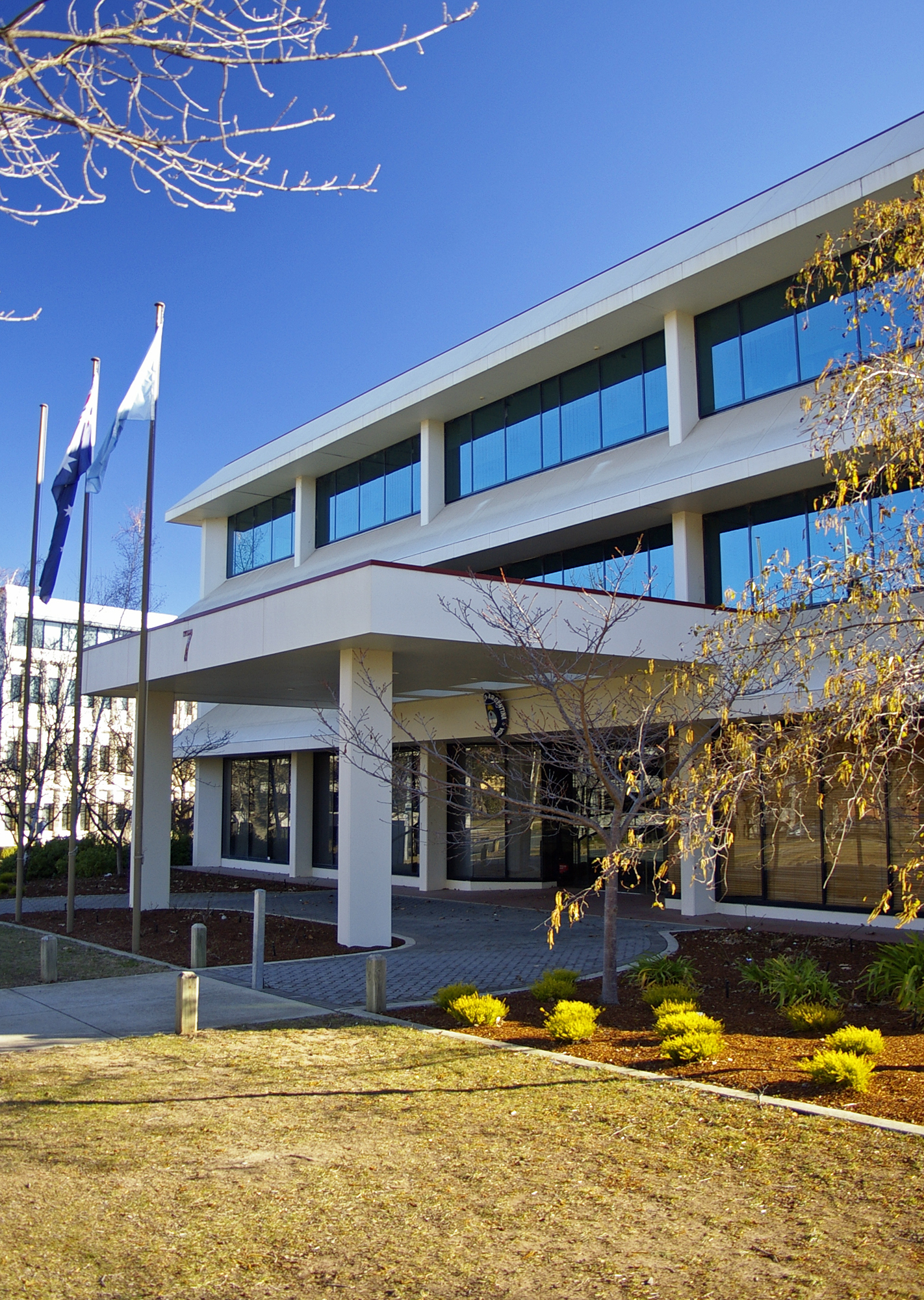
Embassy in Canberra

=== Multilateral organizations ===
| Organization | Host country | Host city | Mission | Concurrent accreditation | Ref. |
|---|---|---|---|---|---|
| Organization of American States | United States | Washington, D.C. | Permanent Mission | | |
| UNESCO | France | Paris | Permanent Mission | | |
| United Nations | United States | New York City | Permanent Mission | | |
| United Nations | Switzerland | Geneva | Permanent Mission | Multilateral Organizations: World Trade Organization | |

== Closed missions ==
=== Africa ===
| Host country | Host city | Mission | Year closed | Ref. |
|---|---|---|---|---|
| Gabon | Libreville | Embassy | 1993 | |
| Ghana | Accra | Embassy | 1968 | |
| Ivory Coast | Abidjan | Embassy | 1991 | |
| Liberia | Monrovia | Embassy | 1977 | |
| Libya | Tripoli | Embassy (Note: The embassy currently operates temporarily from the premises of the Argentine Embassy in Tunis.) | 2018 | |
| Tanzania | Dar es Salaam | Embassy | 1991 | |
| Zaire (Note: The embassy closed down prior to the renaming of the Republic of Zaire into the Democratic Republic of the Congo in 1997.) | Kinshasa | Embassy | 1992 | |
| Zimbabwe | Harare | Embassy | 2002 | |

=== Americas ===
| Host country | Host city | Mission | Year closed | Ref. |
|---|---|---|---|---|
| Chile | Arica | Consulate | 1990 | |
| Colombia | Medellín | Consulate-General | 1995 | |
| Saint Lucia | Castries | Embassy | 2019 | |
| United States | Baltimore | Consulate | 1990 | |
| Uruguay | Punta del Este | Consulate | 1990 | |
| Venezuela | Caracas | Embassy (Note: Staff were expelled after the 2024 Venezuelan presidential election. Brazil looked after the premises until January 2026; as of September 2026 the government did not plan to reopen the embassy until there was democratic progress in Venezuela.) | 2024 | |

=== Asia ===
| Host country | Host city | Mission | Year closed | Ref. |
|---|---|---|---|---|
| Iraq | Baghdad | Embassy | 1992 | |
| Republic of China (Taiwan) | Taipei | Embassy (Note: Now continues as an Trade & Cultural Office in Taipei.) | 1972 | |

=== Europe ===
| Host country | Host city | Mission | Year closed | Ref. |
|---|---|---|---|---|
| East Germany (Note: Argentina closed its embassy in East Berlin upon the reunification of Germany in 1990, which saw the dissolution of the Democratic Republic of Germany.) | East Berlin | Embassy | 1990 | |
| European Union | Brussels | Embassy (Note: Merged into the Embassy to Belgium, which took over its functions.) | 2026 | |

== See also ==
- Foreign relations of Argentina
- List of diplomatic missions in Argentina
- Visa policy of Argentina
