= Argentine Foreigner's Identity card =

Document issued to non-Argentine citizens living in Argentina

Argentine Foreigner's Identity card DNI para extranjeros
- Obverse

- Reverse
- Type: Identity card
- Issued by: Argentina
- Purpose: Identification
- Eligibility: Lawful non-citizens residents residing in Argentina

The Argentina foreigner's identity card (Spanish: DNI para Extranjeros) was a document issued to non-Argentine citizens living in Argentina.

Prior to the "DNI libreta celeste" (DNI Blue booklet), foreigner's IDs and additional provisions were also in distinct color, and with the inscription "EXTRANJERO" (FOREIGNER) with different format and pages form than green booklet for nationals. On the old pre-biometric DNI, it used to have the inscription "EXTRANJERO" in red print, but it was later removed in 2021, And since 2022 it is not included. Today, Argentine Identity cards are fairly as the same as for citizens as for foreigners. However, the term "DNI for foreigners" is still used. Within Argentina, it is sufficient to know where they are and to show them to the police within a reasonable amount of time, when requested.

== History ==
Venezuelan migrants in Argentina face long waits to obtain identity cards for their children, a key document for accessing education and healthcare.

The regulation and issuance of identity documents for foreign residents in Argentina has evolved through several administrative resolutions and policy reforms since the 1990s.

In 1994, the Ministerio del Interior issued Resolución N° 4478/1994, which allowed foreign residents with at least ten years of residence in the country to obtain a Documento Nacional de Identidad (DNI) without presenting their birth certificate, provided they could show a certificate of residence issued by the Dirección Nacional de Migraciones or an identity card from the Policía Federal Argentina.

Example of digital booklet in bordeux format

At the beginning, they were burgundy identity cards with "EXTRANJERO" legend at the cover, with different paging rather than the Argentine nationals. This was also conserved at the "DNI Blue booklet" that Argentines had instead of non-citizens.

To initiate procedures before the Administración Nacional de la Seguridad Social (ANSES) or their respective Administradora de Fondos de Jubilaciones y Pensiones (AFJP), all foreign residents with permanent residence status had to have a DNI, according to the Secretaría de Seguridad Social's 1997 Resolución N° 18/1997.

Resolución N° 1355/2004 of the Registro Nacional de las Personas (RENAPER) brought about additional changes to the administrative handling and design of identity documents in 2004. This resolution modified the legend printed in the DNI booklet for both national and foreign minors to reflect updates introduced by Decreto N° 538/2004, concerning document validity and renewal timelines.

Manually issued DNI booklets (usually green, burgundy, or light blue) would no longer be valid as travel documents as of November 1, 2016, according to Registro Nacional de las Personas' 2016 Resolución N° 480/2016. However, they would still be valid for other domestic purposes until March 31, 2017. This action brought Argentina's identification requirements into compliance with the Organización de Aviación Civil Internacional's (OACI) standards.

The term "EXTRANJERO" was eliminated from DNI cards given to foreign residents of Argentina in 2021 when RENAPER issued Disposición N° 902/2021. By making sure that the DNI's design no longer separated holders based on their nationality status, the measure most likely aimed to advance equality and lessen discrimination.

Since 2022, the "EXTRANJERO" legend is not included in newer Argentine Identity cards.

== Legal aspects ==
=== Types of residence permits ===
==== Limited residence permit ====
A limited residence permit (Residencia precaria, lit. precarious residence) is valid for a certain period of time and is issued for a certain purpose:

- reside
- work
- study

Older Burgundy booklet that was issued for foreigners, before the introduction of the blue booklet.

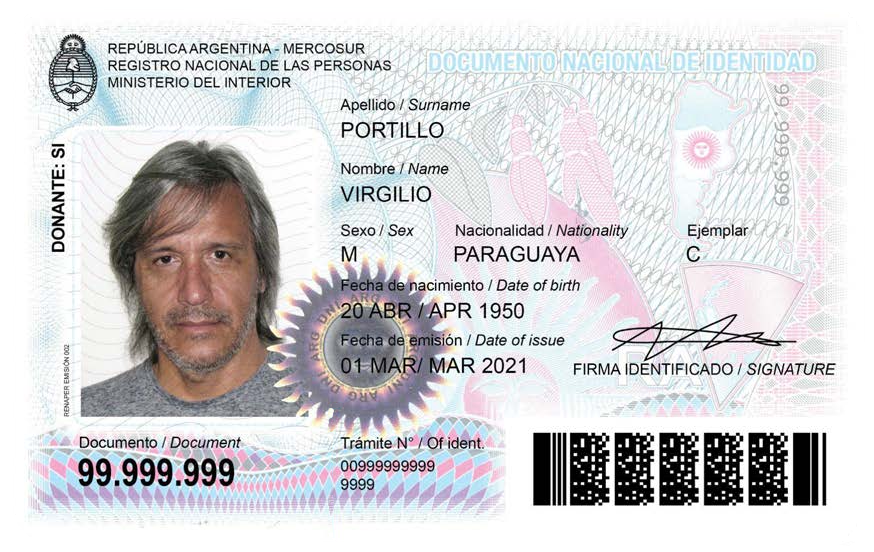
Newer Argentine "Unique" Idenitity cards. It is note that the "Extranjero" lengend is gone.

The DNI Extranjeros did grant the right to work; instead the permission to work had to be explicitly mentioned in the document.

==== Unlimited residence permit ====
An unlimited residence permit (Residencia permanente, lit. Permanent residence) is a permanent residence permit. It grants the right to live and work in Argentina. A foreigner receives a settlement permit if:

- Was a family member of an Argentine national.
- Was a family member of a foreign national who has permanent residence.
- Has a temporary residence valid for 2 (TWO) years, if the person are a MERCOSUR national.
- Had a temporary residence valid for 3 (THREE) years, if the person are a national of a country that is not part of MERCOSUR.
- Have served as a diplomatic official for the periods detailed in the previous points.

== Physical appearance ==
Since the pre-biometric DNI Tarjeta, the DNI for foreigners (credit card size) plastic cards was very similar to national citizens but including the "EXTRANjERO" print previously mentioned. In the back, it included more details about the residence of the person.

=== Front side ===
The front side showed the following information:

- Photo of ID card holder (according to the standards)
- Document number: 9 alphanumeric digits
- Surname
- Given name(s)
- Exipiry date: dd-mm-yyyy
- Place of issue
- Place of birth
- Nationality (Name of the country only in Spanish)
- Date of birth:dd-mm-yyyy
- Sex (M or F)
- EXTRANJERO Inscription
- Note:
  - Number started with 9, instead of 8 and before as nationals.

=== Back side ===
The back side contained the following information:

- Address of residence
- Place of birth
- No of procedure
- CUIL No
- Country of birth
- Date of entry (into the nation) (dd.mm.yyyy)
- Entry category (TEMPORARIA or PERMANENTE)
- Disposición
- Filing date (dd.mm.yyyy)
- Expiry (Only for temporary) (dd.mm.yyyy)
- Machine-readable zone

=== Machine-readable zone ===
The three-line machine-readable zone on the back side contained the following information:

==== First line ====
positions	text	meaning
1–2	ID	identity document
3-5	ARG	issuing country: Argentina (Argentina)
6–14	alphanumeric digits	document number
15	decimal digit	check digit over 6–14

==== Second line ====
positions	text	meaning
1–6	decimal digits	date of birth (YYMMDD)
7	decimal digit	check digit over 1–6
8	decimal digit	First letter of the name or second name
9–14	decimal digits	date of expiry (YYMMDD)
15	decimal digit	check digit over 9–14
16-18	ARG	code of the country: Argentina (Argentina)
30	decimal digit	check digit over 6–30 (upper line), 1–7, 9–15, 19–29 (middle line)

==== Third line ====
positions	text	meaning
1–30	alphabetic digits<alphabetic digits<alphabetic digits	SURNAME<< GIVEN<NAMES

Empty spaces are represented by "<".

=== Security features ===
- The Argentine identity card for foreigners contained the following security features:
- Holographic laminate
- Guilloche and numismatic backgrounds
- Kinegram (SUN) with relief effect and legend DNI ARG
- PDF417 code
- National Ceibo Flower
- Bicontinental Map of Argentina with the national flag inside
- Laser-burned numbering in relief
- Kinegram (SUN) with rotation effect and legends (DNI / RA) and guilloche rosette around the face
- OVI ink
- Monochrome photographic image modulated in guilloches
- Mechanical reading code
- Three-color offset security background (pink, light blue, with light blue reaction to green in UV light)
- Thumb digit image

== Gallery of historic images ==
Older Argentine burgundy Foreigner's Identity card, where data and pages were different.

Message on the final page on the older burgundy Argentine Foreigner's Identity Card.

Argentine Foreigner's Identity card, 2009 model. When Argentines still had the Blue booklet or "Libreta celeste" document.

== See also ==
- Argentine passport
- Argentine Identity card
- Visa policy of Argentina
- Permanent residency
