= Driving licence in Argentina =

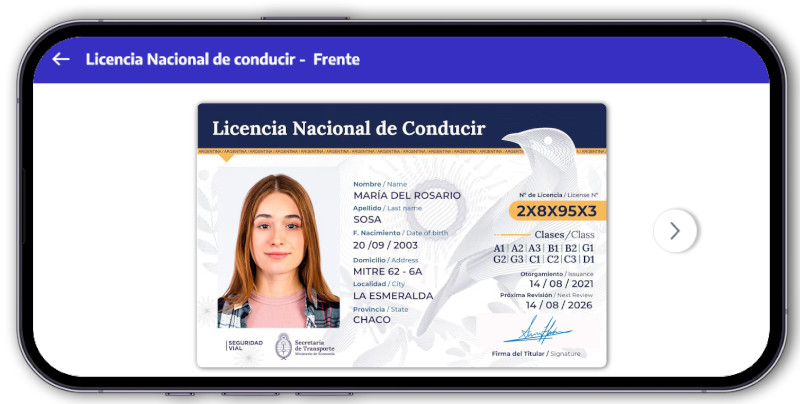
- Argentine digital driver's license (2025 mockup)
- Type: Driving licence
- Issued by: Argentina
- Purpose: Proof of permission to legally operate a motor vehicle
- Expiration: After 5 (Maximum)

In Argentina, the driving licence ("Licencia Nacional de Conducir") is a governmental privilege given to those who request a licence for any of the categories they desire. It is required for every type of motorised vehicle with the exception of the smallest mopeds below 50 cm^{3}, with a speed limit of 25 km/h, as well as motorised bicycles (even for these, there is a minimum age of 16 years and a small mandatory driving school course).

The minimum age to obtain a driving licence is:

- 17 years for Two-wheeled motorcycles with a displacement of more than 50 cc and up to 150 cc, and/or electric motorcycles with a power of 4 to 11 kW., Cars, vans and utility vehicles weighing up to 3,500 kg.
- 21 years for Trucks without trailer or semi-trailer and motorized mobile homes weighing more than 3,500 kg. Includes B.1., Vehicles for transporting up to 4 passengers, excluding the driver. Includes Class B.1., among others.

== Obtaining a driving licence ==
The practical driving test for cars is conducted on the road using dual-control vehicles provided by the testing centers. Tests are available at the following locations: Communal Sub-Offices 2, 3, Citizen Attention Unit (Communal Sub-Office 4 - Cruz de Malta), Communal Sub-Offices 7, and Communal Offices 5, 6, 10, 11, 12, 13, 14, and 15. Applicants can choose between manual and automatic vehicles, except at Sub-Office 9, where only manual cars are available. Once the transmission type (manual or automatic) is selected, it cannot be changed on the day of the test. A preparatory video is available, providing essential information and requirements for the examination. Motorcycles, Heavy Vehicles, and Special-Purpose Vehicles The practical test for motorcycles, heavy vehicles, and special-purpose vehicles is conducted exclusively at the Roca Office. Candidates must present the following documents:

- Green Card (vehicle registration)
- Mandatory Vehicle Technical Inspection Certificate (VTVO)
- Proof of vehicle insurance
- Driver's licence of the accompanying person

A preparatory video is also available for these categories. To reschedule a test date or retake a practical driving test (on the road, at a track, or for a professional licence), applicants must visit a licensing office in person to arrange a new appointment. Those who fail the test can schedule a re-evaluation through the online platform. Testing Sequence for Multiple Categories For candidates applying for both a car licence and another vehicle category (e.g., motorcycle or heavy vehicle), the car test must be completed first at the chosen location. Upon passing, a subsequent test for the second category will be scheduled at the Roca Office. If successful, the candidate must return to the original testing location to collect their driver's licence. Weather-Dependent Evaluations Track-based evaluations at the Roca Office, whether for new licences or category extensions, are subject to weather conditions. In the event of heatwaves, rain, thunderstorms, or other severe weather events, the Directorate of Road Safety (DGHC) may temporarily suspend track-based evaluations for safety reasons. If an evaluation is interrupted due to adverse weather, it will be rescheduled accordingly.

== National driving types ==
In Argentina, the National Driver's classes as defined in the national law are applied. In addition, however, there are national driving licence classes that are only valid in Argentina.

Class	Description
Class A 1.1	Mopeds up to 50 cc engine capacity and/or electric mopeds up to 4 kW..
Class A 1.2	Motorcycles up to 150 cc engine capacity and/or electric motorcycles up to 11 kw.
Class A 1.3	Motorcycles over 150 cc and up to 300 cc engine capacity, and/or electric motorcycles from 11 to 20 kW.
Class A 1.4	Motorcycles over 300 cc engine capacity, and/or electric motorcycles over 20 kW.
Class A 2.1	Three- or four-wheeled motorcycles without a cabin up to 300 cc and/or electric three- or four-wheeled motorcycles up to 20 kW.
Class A 2.2	Three- or four-wheeled motorcycles without a cabin over 300 cc and/or electric three- or four-wheeled motorcycles over 20 kW.
Class A 3	Three- or four-wheeled motorcycles with a cabin and driving wheel.
Class B 1	Automobiles, utility vehicles, pickup trucks, vans for private use, and motorized motorhomes up to 3,500 kg.
Class B 2	Automobiles, utility vehicles, pickup trucks, vans for private use, and motorized motorhomes up to 3,500 kg with a trailer up to 750 kg or a non-motorized camper.
Class C 1	Trucks without a trailer, semi-trailer, or articulated trailer weighing more than 3,500 kg and up to 12,000 kg.
Class C 2	Trucks without a trailer, semi-trailer, or articulated trailer weighing more than 12,000 kg and up to 24,000 kg.
Class C 3	Trucks without a trailer, semi-trailer, or articulated trailer weighing more than 24,000 kg.
Class D 1	Passenger transport vehicles up to 8 passengers, excluding the driver
Class D 2	Passenger transport vehicles from 8 to 20 passengers, excluding the driver.
Class D 3	Passenger transport vehicles over 20 passengers, excluding the driver.
Class D 4	Emergency vehicle.
Class E 1	Class C or D vehicles, with one or more trailers.
Class E 2	Special non-agricultural machinery.
Class F	Adapted vehicles for people with special needs.
Class G 1	Agricultural tractors.
Class G 2	Special agricultural machinery.
Class G 3	Agricultural road train.

== Driving license card (not issued anymore) ==
Before the digitalization in 2025, every licensed driver were issued with a Carnét de coducir, which they are required to have available for inspection whenever they exercise the privileges granted by the license.

=== Layout of a driving license card ===
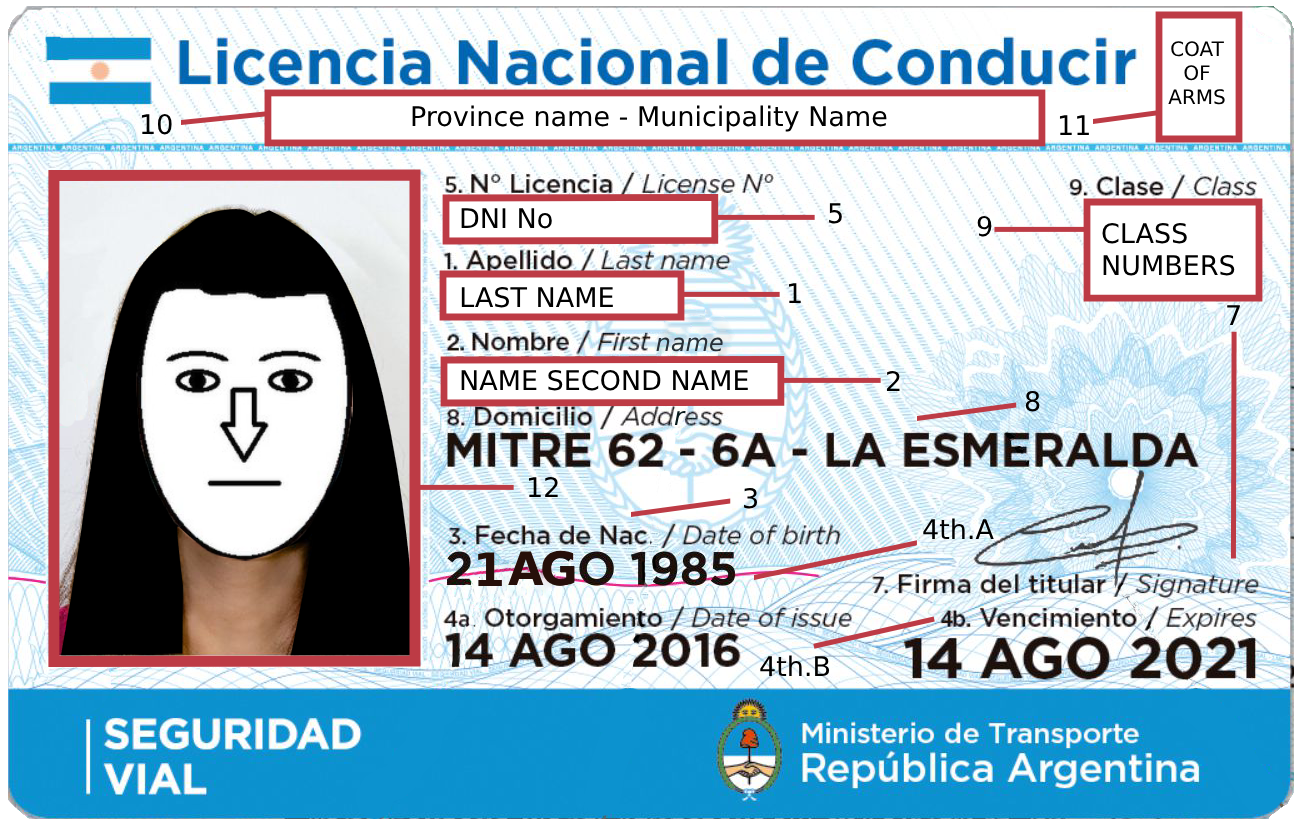
Argentine driving license sample with labels

	Licencia Nacional de Conducir
Provincia de - Municipality
Photo	9. Clase / Class
Photo	5. N° Licencia / License N°
Photo	1. Apellido / Last Surname
Photo	2. Nombre / First name
Photo	8. Domicilio / Address
Photo	3. Fecha de nac. / Birth date
Photo	4.a Otorgamiento / Date of issue
Photo	7. Firma del Titular / Signature; 4b Vencimiento / Expires
|SEGURIDAD; VIAL Ministerio de Transporte; República Argentina

The sections of the sample license shown are:

No.	Spanish	English	Notes
1	Apellido	Last name	
2	Nombre	Last name and first name	
3	Fecha de nacimiento	Date of birth	
4.a	Otorgamiento	Date of issue of the card	
4.b	Vencimiento	Date of expiry of the card	
5	Licencia N°	Licence No	The number of the licence is the same of the national identity card.
7	Fima	Holder's Signature	
8	Domicilio	Address	
9	Clase	Class	The classes of the vehicles allowed
10	Provincia de - Municipio	Province and municipality	In the case of the Autonomous city of Buenos Aires, appears as "Ciudad Autónoma de Buenos Aires".
11	Escudo de Armas	Coat of arms of each province	
12	Foto	Photo of the driver's portrait.	

=== Card validity ===
The Argentine driver's licence in its physical format does not have an expiration date and remains valid as long as the corresponding digital licence is valid.

There is no maximum age limit for holding a licence. However, drivers aged 65 years or older must renew it by certifying their psychophysical fitness every three years, while those over 70 must do so annually.

In Argentina, where the Argentine Identity card (DNI) is the primary and mandatory identity document, the driver's licence is generally not accepted as an official form of identification. Nevertheless, it is sometimes used de facto as proof of identity for certain transactions or informal procedures.

== Gallery of historic images ==
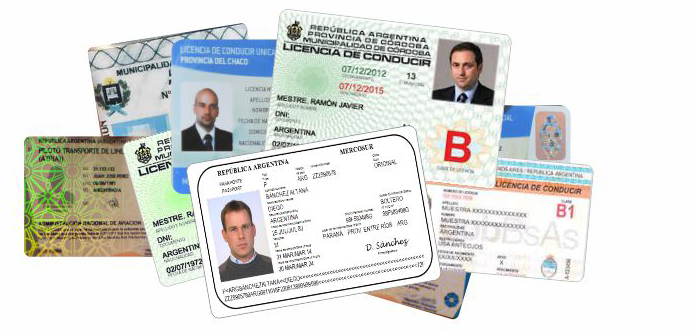
A bunch of older licenses issued by the municipalities. Before the sanction of the Law 26.363, each municipality had its own driver's license design, and requirements.

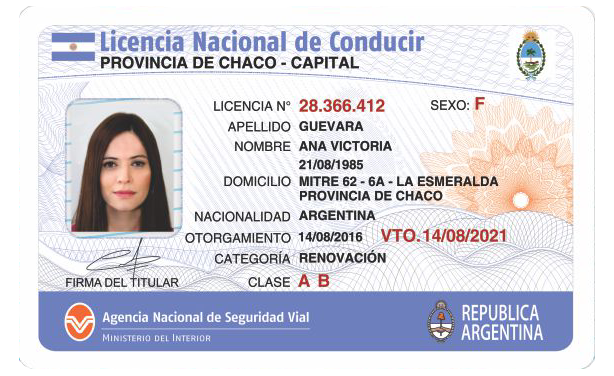
Oldest design of the first "Unified" National Driver's License (2010)

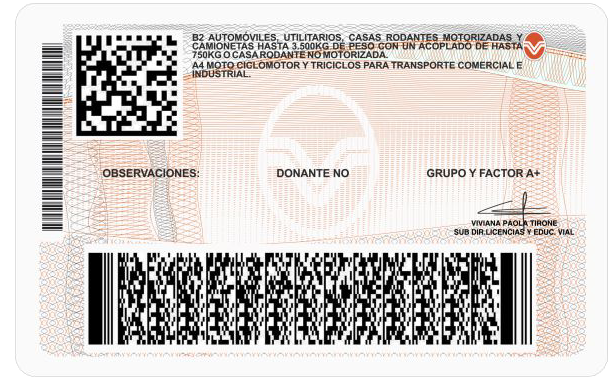
Back of the first "National driver's license"

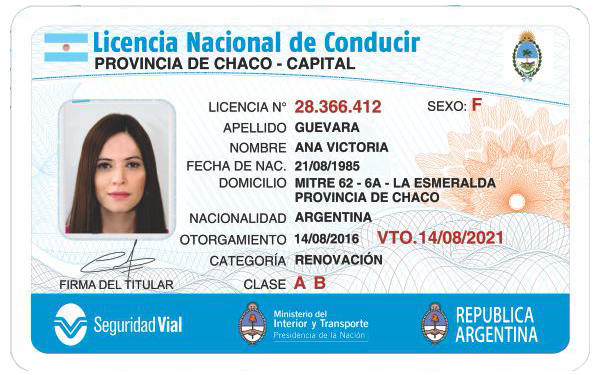
2013 Redisign of the National Driver's License

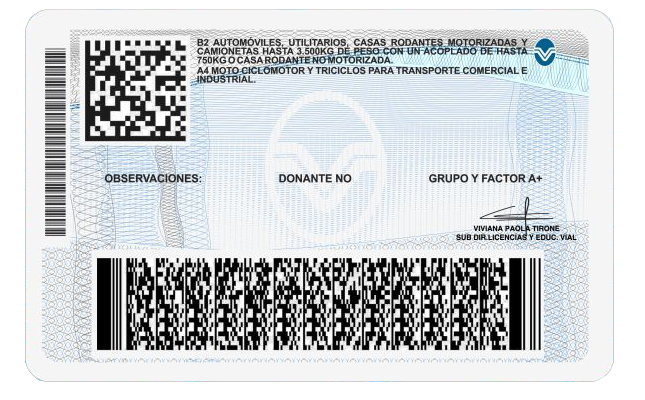
Back of the redesign of the driver's license

Old Argentine paper driving license

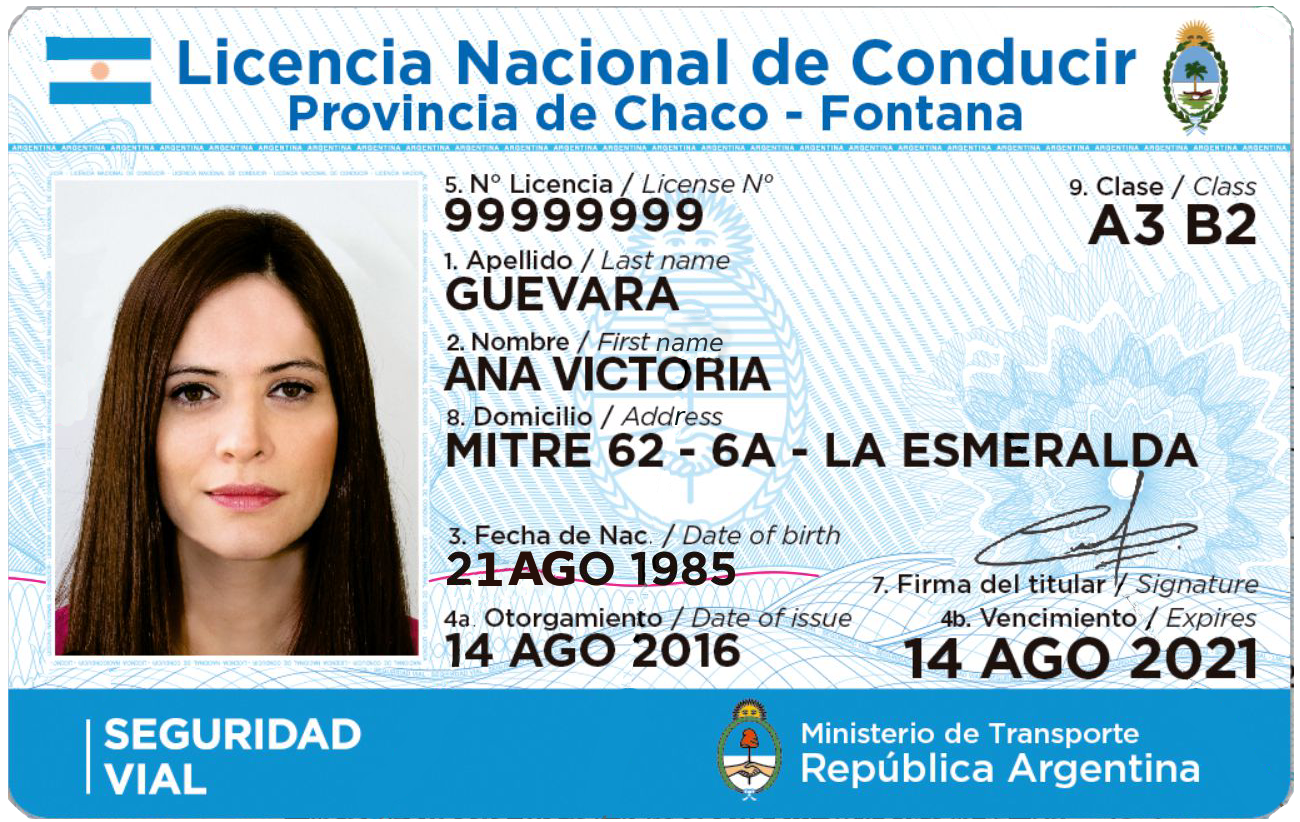
Latest physical driver license

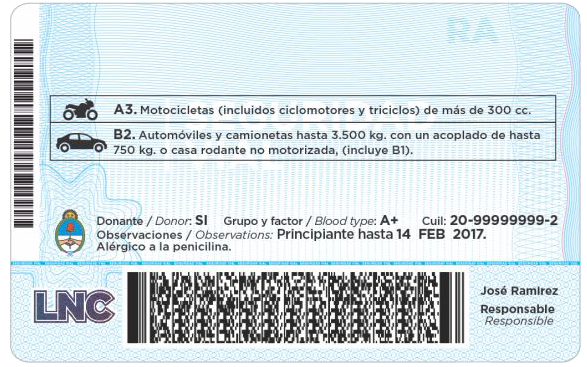
Back of the latest physical model

== See also ==
- Argentine Identity card
- Argentine passport
