= Cédula de Identidad Provincial Electrónica =

Electronic identity card issued by the Province of San Luis, Argentina

- Type: Identity card
- Issued by: Government of the Province of San Luis
- Purpose: Identification and digital authentication
- Eligibility: Residents of the Province of San Luis
- Expiration: Varies

The Cédula de Identidad Provincial Electrónica (CIPE; Provincial Electronic Identity Card) is an electronic identity card issued by the Province of San Luis, Argentina. Established by Provincial Law No. V-0698-2009, it is an optional provincial credential that combines physical identification with digital authentication and legally recognized digital signature capabilities. Introduced in 2010, the CIPE was the first smart-card identity document implemented by an Argentine provincial government and among the earliest electronic identity systems deployed in Latin America for public administration. The card contains an embedded cryptographic microprocessor that enables secure identification, authentication, and digital signing of electronic documents. For participating municipalities, it can also incorporate the provincial driver's licence (CIPE-LC).

== History ==
=== Background ===
Beginning in the early 2000s, the Government of San Luis implemented an extensive digital government programme centred on the Autopista de la Información, broadband connectivity, electronic public services and the adoption of digital signatures. As part of this modernisation strategy, provincial authorities developed an electronic identity card capable of securely identifying citizens in digital environments while enabling legally valid electronic signatures.

=== Legal framework ===
The CIPE was established by Provincial Law No. V-0698-2009, enacted in 2009. The law defines the CIPE as an electronic provincial identity credential incorporating cryptographic technology for authentication and digital signature. It also establishes that the document is voluntary and does not replace Argentina's National Identity Document (DNI), which remains the country's sole national identity document. Among its stated objectives are: secure identification of residents; authentication in electronic transactions; digital signature; electronic government services; and protection of electronic information through cryptographic methods.

=== Implementation ===
Following the enactment of the law, the provincial government contracted the technological infrastructure required for the system and announced that the CIPE would become the first electronic identity document issued by an Argentine province. According to iProfesional, the project represented an investment of approximately ARS 8.2 million and integrated biometric identification, smart-card technology and digital signature infrastructure. The first CIPE was issued on 29 November 2010 in the town of Concarán. Carlos Ignacio Bertello became the first recipient of the document. Initial issuance centres were established in Concarán, San Luis and Villa Mercedes before gradually expanding throughout the province.

== Technology ==
The CIPE incorporates an embedded integrated circuit (smart chip) that stores cryptographic certificates and authentication credentials. Its principal functions include: electronic identification; digital authentication; legally recognised digital signatures; secure access to provincial electronic services; and storage of additional provincial credentials. Subsequent versions introduced NFC (Near Field Communication) technology, allowing compatible mobile devices to interact with the card.

== CIPE-LC ==
One of the principal features of the system is the integration of the provincial driver's licence into the same smart card, known as CIPE-LC. The unified credential enables both personal identification and proof of driving authorisation while preserving the electronic authentication and digital signature functions of the CIPE.

== Issuance ==
The CIPE is issued free of charge through authorised issuance centres operated by the Government of San Luis. By 2013, more than 76,000 credentials had been issued. By 2019, approximately 294,000 residents possessed a CIPE, with 50 issuance centres operating across the province. Provincial budget documents published in 2024 and 2025 state that the CIPE remains in active use, incorporates NFC technology and continues to be issued through fixed and mobile enrolment centres.

== See also ==
- Digital signature
- Electronic identification
- Argentine identity card
