= Alphanumeric brand name =

An alphanumeric brand name is a brand name composed only of both letters and numbers (alphanumericals). Examples include 7 Up, Audi A4, Canon A75. They may serve as abbreviations (e.g. 3M, formerly known as the Minnesota Mining and Manufacturing Company), indicate model extensions (iPhone 3G, iPhone 4, etc.), symbolize physical product attributes (the V-shaped V8 engine), incorporate technical attributes (AMD32 chips use 32-bit processors), refer to inventory codes or internal design numbers (e.g., Levi's 501).

== Overview ==
Kunter Gunasti and William T. Ross (2010) define two dimensions of alphanumeric brand names: "link", or the connection between the brand name and a specific product feature or the product as a whole; and "alignability", or whether the preferences for a product can be aligned with the numbers included in the brand names in an ascending or descending trend.

Yan and Duclos opine that numbers in alphanumeric brand names can act as "implicit anchors" on customer's perceptions of the value of products.

Selcan Kara, Gunasti and Ross (2015) delineated the number and letter components of alphanumeric brands and observed that for new brand extensions firms can either change the letters or numbers of their parent brand names. Altering the number components of brand names (e.g. Audi A3 vs. A4 vs. A6 vs. A8) led to more favorable consumer reactions compared to changing the letter components (e.g. Mercedes C350 vs. E350 vs. S350).

Gunasti and Timucin Ozcan (2016) further categorized alphanumeric brand names as either "round" or "non-round". They showed that use of "round numbers" in brand names is pervasive because this practice increases the tendency of consumers to perceive products as more complete (including all necessary attributes). For example, labeling an identical product with an "S200" brand (round number) as opposed to an "S198" or "S203" brand can make consumers believe that the product is superior and more well-rounded. They also found that the presence of competitor alphanumeric brand name (e.g. Garmin 370) can affect consumer choices among the focal brand (e.g. TomTom 350 vs. TomTom 360). Gunasti and Berna Devezer (2016) observed that this effect occurs only for competing firms' products.
