= Código Único de Identificación Laboral =

Argentine identification number

The Unique Labor Identification Code (Código Único de Identificación Laboral) (CUIL) is the number given to each worker at the beginning of their employment activity in a dependent relationship, who belongs to the Integrated Retirement and Pension System (SIJP), and to each person who manages any benefit or service of Social Security in the Argentine Republic.

It is a key composed of the National Identity Document (DNI) number with a two-digit prefix and a postfix digit as a verification digit. First, the two digits of the prefix are written followed by a hyphen, then the DNI number with eight digits (padded with leading zeros if necessary) followed by another hyphen, and finally the verification digit. It is expressed, for example: "20-08490848-8" where "08490848" is the person's DNI, "20" is the prefix, and "8" is the verification digit.

In Argentina, the procedure to obtain the CUIL is carried out before the National Social Security Administration (ANSeS).The CUIL is mainly used by state agencies to reliably identify a single person and to monitor their pension contributions. Additionally, this code is used to carry out various procedures both in public agencies and companies.

== Controversy ==
The prefixes 20, 23, 24, and 27 were used, with 20 for male and 27 for female. Since Circular DPA No. 18/12 of June 12, 2012, the previous classification has been abandoned and the CUIL is not modified in the case of a gender change procedure. ANSES was requested to modify the CUIL number for transgender people who have completed the DNI change procedure.

== See also ==
- Documento Nacional de Identidad (Argentina)
