= Argentine identity card =

National identity card of Argentina

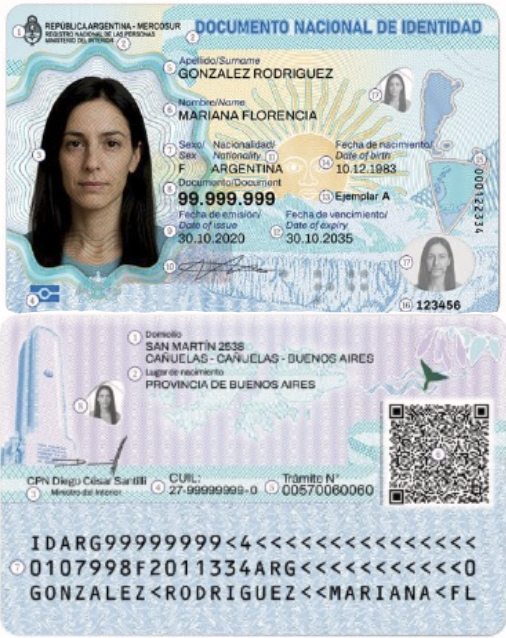
- Specimen of the credit-card sized Argentine identity card issued since February 2026
- Type: national identity document
- Issued by: Argentina
- Valid in: Mercosur members and associated countries (except Guyana Suriname Panama); Andean Community
- Expiration: 15 years (Since updated at 14 years of age); Under 14:The validity will be until the age of updates of 5/8, or 14 years, as appropriate, is reached. (Note: Previously, the update was at 16 years old.)

The Argentine identity card, Spanish: Documento Nacional de Identidad pronounced [dˌokumˈɛnto nˌaθjonˈal dˈe ˌiðentiðˈad]) or DNI lit. 'National Identity Document'), is issued to Argentine nationals and any foreign national by local registration offices (registro civiles) or CDRs in Argentina and diplomatic missions abroad, while it is produced at the Unitec Blue in Chascomús.

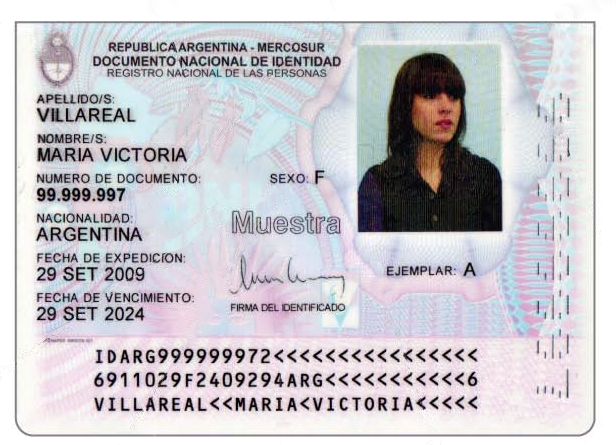
Specimen of the larger "Libreta" Argentine DNI issued between 2009 and 2011, valid until 2017 for people under 75, issued for María Victoria Villareal (placeholder). It is suggestested that the bicontinental map– part of the feature added in 2020 revision of pre-biometric verision– can be seen on the right

== Obligation of identification ==
=== Legal requirement in Argentina ===
Once updated at 14 years-old, the Argentine identity card has CAN code.

Law No. 17,671 of De Identificación, Registro y Clasificación del Potencial Humano Nacional, enacted in 1968, stipulates in its article 13 that no means of identification can replace the Argentine identity card issued by ReNaPer.

It is mandatory for exercising the right to vote and for identification before judicial authorities. The Argentine identity cardis also required for carrying out procedures with state authorities, and it also authorizes the holder to work legally within the country (subject to national labor laws, which prohibit the employment of children and adolescents).

It is obligatory for Argentine citizens and residents to have a National Identity Document (DNI); this is the Obligation of Identification. The document is a means of verifying one's identity and exercising various fundamental rights. This obligation is rooted in both legal entitlement and civic duty. The issuance of DNIs falls under the jurisdiction of the National Registry of Persons (RENAPER), which oversees the administration and distribution of these essential identification documents.

All Argentine nationals, whether residing within the country or abroad, and foreign individuals resident in Argentina, are required to possess a valid DNI.

The process of obtaining a DNI typically begins at birth: parents or legal guardians are required to register a child within 40 days of birth, free of charge, at Civil Registry offices, delegated centers, or designated public hospitals. A lifelong DNI number is assigned. Children's DNI must be updated between the ages of 5 and 8, and upon reaching the age of 14. Renewal may also be necessary for various reasons such as changes in personal information or in case of damage, loss, or theft. Noteworthy legal provisions, such as National Law 26.743 on Gender Identity, enable individuals to request modifications to their DNI to reflect their self-perceived gender identity.

Required documentation for birth registration includes the parents' DNIs, the birth certificate issued by the healthcare facility, vaccination records if requested, and relevant acknowledgment or adoption certificates if applicable.

In cases where parents or guardians are resident foreign nationals, presentation of a valid Argentine foreigner's DNI along with an unexpired passport or identity card from their country is mandatory.

Old Cédula de identidad de la Policía Federal, issued for foreigners when the "Libreta Cívica/de Enrolamiento" was still issued.

If parents have never possessed a DNI, alternate procedures are in place requiring testimony from two adult witnesses to verify their identity. Should the Civil Registry refuse registration under these circumstances, recourse can be sought through the nearest CAJ (Center for Legal Assistance).

During the registration process, the newborn's photograph and fingerprints are captured. Parents or guardians receive the birth certificate and confirmation of the DNI application, with exemptions in cases where marriage certificates are available, allowing for individual registration.

=== Issuance and availability ===
The Argentine National Identity Card is issued by the National Registry of People (Registro nacional de las Personas) in the individual's district of residency. It is a mandatory identity, and must be renewed. There are fines if not. Argentine nationals living outside Argentina must also obtain the identity card through Argentine embassies and consulates. To obtain or renew the card, individuals must undergo an in-person identity verification process.

Unlike Argentine passports, Argentine identity cards are valid for fifteen years if over 14 years old (after the update). However, if the cardholder is under 14 old at the time of issuance, the validity period must be at their update age (8 and 14).

The ID card currently costs 7.500 pesos 14.000 pesos if the holder is a foreigner on the date of issue when issued within Argentina.

== Travel validity ==
The validity of the Argentine card for travel extends to all member states of the Mercosur, associated, as well as the other Comunidad Andina states such as Peru, Colombia, Bolivia, and Ecuador.

Furthermore, the Argentine identity card serves as a recognized travel document in Brasil as a per-registration (pre-cadastro) for those overage (max 90 days).

Foreign citizens (of any nationality) who are permanent residents in Argentina can enter Chile for tourism purposes using their Argentine identity card without a visa or any document proving their permanent residency.

=== Limitations and exceptions ===
Most other countries require a passport and, in some cases, a travel visa. The Guyana, Suriname, Falkland Islands, and the non-European parts of the Netherlands do not accept the Argentine identity card for entry. When flying to French overseas territories, passengers may need to avoid transitional points in countries that do not recognize the ID card.

== History ==
Since 2012, the Argentine Identity card was only in a card format.

Before the introduction of the DNI in 1968, women had a Libreta cívica ("civic booklet"); men a Libreta de enrolamiento ("(military) enrollment booklet"). The identity card was instituted by the Argentine military regime, making the Ley de Identificación, Registro y Clasificación del Potencial Humano Nacional.

This Law stablishes the creation of RENAPER in order to register all the residents of the country and the obbligation of identification of the identity cards.

For many years, the DNI was issued as a small green booklet (called libreta). In 2009, the DNI was revamped and digitalized; and booklets (now blue) were issued along with an identity card simultaneously.

Since 2012, DNIs are issued only in card format. The new DNI card is required to obtain the new biometric Argentine passport. Foreigners can get it at "RadEx" system but "extranjero" (foreigner) is printed on the back side. Argentines can get a libro de matrícula, which is only for citizens, in consulates.

Example of "DNI Cero Año" handwritten, issued to María Victoria Villareal specimen.

On Resolución 837/98, it was put the design of the idenitity cards in booklet format and its features on the Annexes.

Later, on the Resolución 331/2003, the identity cards would have lasser technology.

On the Decreto 1501/2009, it was approved the use of digital techlogies to make the DNI more robust and safer. This is separate to the Digital Argentine identity card, used miArgentina application.

On the same year, before the approval of the law that made just-in-card, the booklet format had also a redesign to make it similar.

By the Resolución 3020/2014, the Digital DNI (either Card or Booklet) would be the only valid identity cards for daily use. Except for people over 75 years old, who can still in possession of a Civic or enrolment booklet or older handwritten versions of the card.

In 2020, the DNI card was restyled to show the new bicontinental official map of Argentina.

On 20 July 2021, President Alberto Fernández signed a decree (Decreto 476/2021) mandating the RENAPER to allow a third gender option on all DNI cards and passports, marked as an "X". The measure applies to non-citizen permanent residents who possess Argentine identity cards as well. In compliance with the 2012 Gender Identity Law, this made Argentina the first country in South America to legally recognize non-binary gender on all official documentation, freely and upon the person's request.

=== New biometric identity cards ===
In April 2023, an important development occurred in Argentina with regards to the DNI. This development marked a significant step in the ongoing historical narrative surrounding the Falkland Islands (known as the Malvinas Islands in the Argentina) and the recognition of the contributions and sacrifices made by its veterans, putting a new 'seal' with the geographic map of it, with the legend "HEROE DE LAS ISLAS MALVINAS". This update was mandatory only for war veterans. However, it is important to regard that the identity cards still had the legend without the seal, up to 2021.

As of December 2023, the Argentine National Registry of Persons (Renaper), operating under the Ministry of Interior, has introduced the new Biometric National Identity Document (DNI). This cutting-edge identification document stands out for its adherence to the highest international standards in terms of security, technology, and quality. It incorporates an electronic chip and a Data Matrix code, enabling electronic document validation, identity verification, digital functionalities, and enhanced security measures.

Printed using laser technology on polycarbonate, the new document incorporates advanced physical security features to enhance visual verification and prevent counterfeiting. Polycarbonate, known for its durability, serves as the base material, providing increased resilience.

Beginning 2026, during Milei government, the new Argentine identity cards was finally enacted since February. In this time at the PDFs of the Official Gazzete, it can be seen that the Identity cards have CAN code if once updated, and conserves the same format for foreigners. Also, there is a return of the exemplar.

The newer model of Argentine identity cards are produced by RENAPER (National Registry of People), but with a tender with UNITECBLUE., in order to adapt to the newer security features and standards.

For border control and public security processes, tools such as Thales Gemalto Document Verification are used, which allow for the authentication of electronic and optical documents.

=== Biometric data and security ===
On January 26, 2011, Argentina introduced new photograph requirements for the Documento Nacional de Identidad (DNI) through Resolution 169/2011. These regulations outlined specific standards for the image to be included in the DNI. The photograph must be recent, taken from the front, showing a half-bust with the head completely uncovered. The photo should be in color, with a plain, uniform light blue background, and sized at 4 cm by 4 cm. It is essential that the image accurately represents the individual's facial features without any alterations or distortions, ensuring the person's identity is faithfully reflected.

Exceptions to these rules are allowed for religious or health reasons. For example, individuals may cover their hair if required by their religion, as long as the main facial features remain visible. Additionally, those who cover their face for religious reasons can request to have their photo taken in a private setting by a same-sex official.

The resolution also allowed for the continuation of accepting applications with photographs showing a 3/4 right profile until June 30, 2011, after which all applications had to comply with the new front-facing photo requirements.

== Physical appearance ==
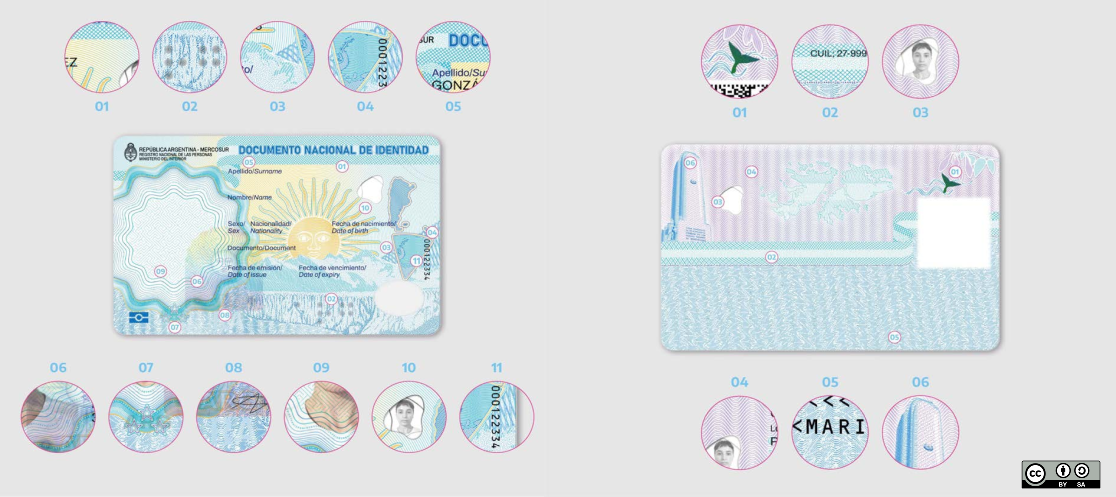
Structure of the new electronic identity card (prototype version issued in December 2023)

Minors identity cards lack of CAN code

The current ID card is an ID-1 (credit card size) polycarbonate with an embedded RFID chip. It is covered with multi-color guillochés and appears blue and light-blue from a distance. All the information on it (except for nationality, DOCUMENTO NACIONAL DE IDENTIDAD, and everything on the rear side), is given in Spanish, and English.

=== Front side ===
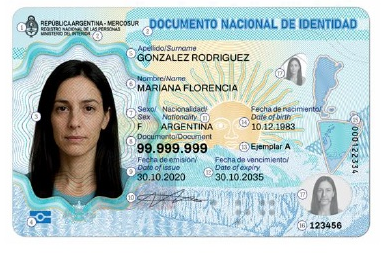
Sample front of an Argentine identity card issued since 2026

The front side shows the Sun of May, the Cockade, the Perito Moreno Glacier, a Bicontinental Map, three stars, and the words "DOCUMENTO NACIONAL DE IDENTIDAD República Argentina - Mercosur". It contains the following information:

- Photo of ID card holder (According to the national standards)
- Document number (8 alphanumeric digits)
- Surname
- Given name(s)
- Date of birth (dd.mm.yyyy)
- Date of expiry (dd.mm.yyyy)
- Date of issue (dd.mm.yyyy)
- Nationality (ARGENTINA, or any other for foreign residents)
- Seal with the legend "EX-COMBATIENTE¨ ¨HÉROE/HEROÍNA DE LA GUERRA DE LAS MALVINAS¨ (Optional) (Note: Despite the field appears as "optional", it is mandatory for war veterans. They receive it as a "distinctive".)
- CAN Number (Not available in minors cards)
- Sex
- Signature of holder

=== Rear side ===
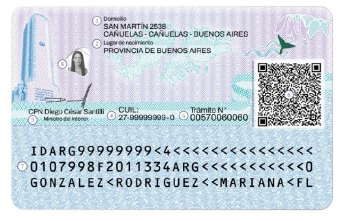
Sample back of an Argentine identity card issued since 2026

The rear side shows the National Flag Memorial, the Argentina Flag, the Falkland Islands map, the ceibo flower, and the southern right whale. It contains the following information:

- Address of residence
- Place of birth
- No of procedure
- CUIL No
- QR code
- Machine-readable zone

For non-citizens, it is also added:

- Country of birth
- Entry category (TEMPORARIA or PERMANENTE)
- Disposición
- Filing date (dd.mm.yyyy)
- Expiry (Only for temporary) (dd.mm.yyyy)

=== Machine-readable zone ===
The MRZ is structured according to the ICAO standard for machine-readable ID cards:

==== First line ====
positions	text	meaning
1–2	ID	identity document
3-5	ARG	issuing country: Argentina (Argentina)
6–14	alphanumeric digits	document number
15	decimal digit	check digit over 6–14

==== Second line ====
positions	text	meaning
1–6	decimal digits	date of birth (YYMMDD)
7	decimal digit	check digit over 1–6
8	decimal digit	First letter of the name or second name
9–14	decimal digits	date of expiry (YYMMDD)
15	decimal digit	check digit over 9–14
16-18	ARG	code of the country: Argentina (Argentina)
30	decimal digit	check digit over 6–30 (upper line), 1–7, 9–15, 19–29 (middle line)

==== Third line ====
positions	text	meaning
1–30	alphabetic digits<alphabetic digits<alphabetic digits	SURNAME<< GIVEN<NAMES

Empty spaces are represented by "<".

==== Different spellings of the same name within the same document ====
- Names of Cyrillic origin (such as Russian): In Argentine DNI, names which originally appeared in non-Latin scripts are transliterated in keeping with international standards such as ISO 9, to give a standard and accurate representation in the Latin alphabet. For example:
  - Ж → Ž
  - Ч → Č
  - Ш → Š
  - Щ → Šč
  - Ю → Û
  - Я → Â

This causes Russian surnames and given names appear uniformly on the DNI, allowing identification and avoiding confusions between writing systems. Although there are no strict standards by law, these regulations are traditionally adhered to in practice for Argentine identification cards.

- Use of diacritics: The Argentine DNI has historically often been issued without diacritics such as acute accents (tildes) in personal names. However, if the omission can be verified against the official birth certificate —the primary source for identity data— a rectification may be requested. Such corrections are considered an issuance error and can be processed without cost if claimed within 90 days of delivery of the document.

== Security features ==
The identity card contains the following security features:

- Front
- Rainbow print or iris print
- Printing of touch surfaces
- Offset printing composed of security backgrounds
- Guilloche of two colors
- Line Width Modulation
- Integrated Transparent Hologram
- Matte surface printing
- Numismatic print design
- Safety background merged with portrait area
- Transparent window
- Pre customized serial number
- Repeating photos within a transparent window (ghost image)
- Laser engraved personal data
- Changing laser imaging
- Changeable portrait photo repetition with copy letter
- Tactile laser engraving on the date of birth data
- Transparent liquid coating of the photographic portrait with typographic personalization of the surname and date of birth
- Safety background merged with portrait area
  - Rear
- OVI optically variable ink.
- Offset printing of security backgrounds
- Transparent window (with mismatched shapes)
- Rainbow print
- Line width modulation
- Numismatic Print Design

=== Chip ===
Newer ID cards contain an ICAO recommendations compatible RFID chip. The chip stores the information given on the ID card (like name or date of birth), the holder's picture and fingerprints. In addition, the new ID card can be used for online authentication, governmental transactions, digital certificate, access to Online Services, etc. An electronic signature, provided by a private company, can also be stored on the chip. The fingerprints take is mandatory. However, there are rare exceptions to this rule, for medical issues, for example. They are uploaded to the Sistema Federal de Identificación Biométrica para la Seguridad (SIBIOS) (Criminal database). To use the online authentication function, the holder needs a six-digit decimal PIN. If the holder types in the wrong PIN, they have to type in the six-digit decimal access code given on the ID card to prove they possess the ID card. If the wrong PIN is used three times, a PUK must be used to unlock the chip. The data on the chip are protected by Basic Access Control and Extended Access Control. The chip's data structure and contactless interface are based on specifications in the ICAO's Doc 9303 series, which defines standards for machine-readable travel documents and their contactless integrated circuits.

== Specimens ==
Argentine identity card specimens are official sample versions of the Argentine identity card (Documento Nacional de Identidad, DNI) published by the National Registry of Persons (RENAPER) and other Argentine government agencies to illustrate the design and security features of identity documents. Like the use of Erika Mustermann and Max Mustermann in Germany, these specimens use fictitious identities instead of real individuals. The most widely used placeholder identity on Argentine DNI specimens is María Victoria Villareal. Other fictitious names, including Daniel Costa, have appeared on official specimen documents and related identity credentials.

=== Placeholder identities ===
Unlike some countries that consistently employ a single fictitious identity for specimen documents, Argentine authorities have used several placeholder identities across different generations of identity documents and administrative credentials.

==== María Victoria Villareal ====
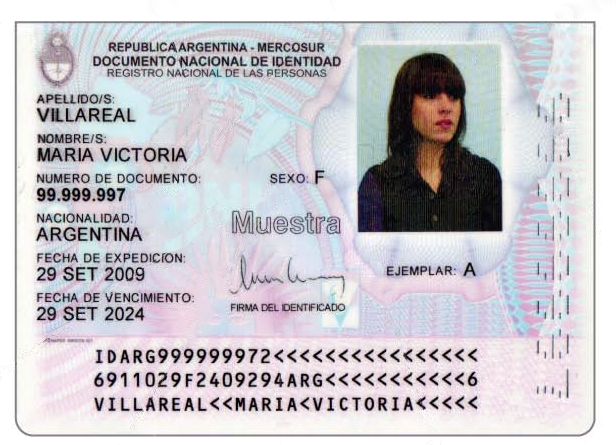
María Victoria Villareal on libreta identity card as placeholder.

María Victoria Villareal is the principal fictitious identity used on specimen versions of the Argentine Documento Nacional de Identidad (DNI). Her name appears on numerous official specimen documents published by RENAPER and reproduced in Argentine legislation, technical documentation, and informational material. The identity has appeared on several generations of the DNI, including, but not limited:

- the 2009–2012 booklet and card format;
- the 2012 biometric card;
- the 2020 redesign incorporating the official bicontinental map of Argentina;
- the 2023 electronic identity card prototype; and
- later specimen documents published in the Official Gazette.

Although the document layout, security features and personal information have changed between revisions, the name María Victoria Villareal has generally been retained as the specimen holder. The photographs appearing on specimen documents depict a real model or government employee rather than a person named María Victoria Villareal, while the accompanying biographical information is fictional and intended solely for demonstration purposes.

==== Virgilio Portillo ====
Virgilio Portillo was used as the placeholder identity on earlier specimen versions of the pre-biometric Argentine DNI, particularly those issued to foreign residents. His identity appears in official specimen documents reproduced from Argentine legislation and technical documentation. The personal data shown on these documents are fictitious and intended exclusively for illustrative purposes.

==== Manuela Martínez/Fernández ====
Manuela Martínez and Manuela Fernández are related female placeholder identities used on Argentine specimen identity cards. Different revisions of specimen documents employ one surname or the other while retaining substantially similar personal information, suggesting that the identity was modified during successive redesigns of the DNI rather than representing different fictional individuals. Their names appear on official specimen cards preserved on derived from RENAPER publications.

==== Daniel Costa ====
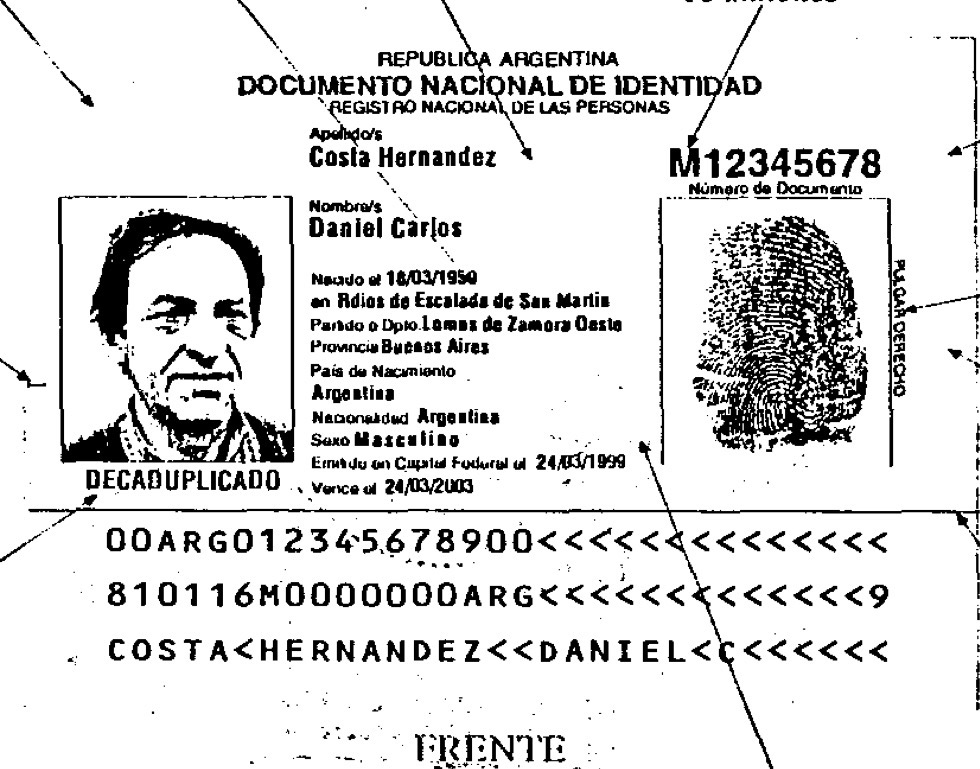
Specimen identity card for Daniel Carlos Costa Hernández.

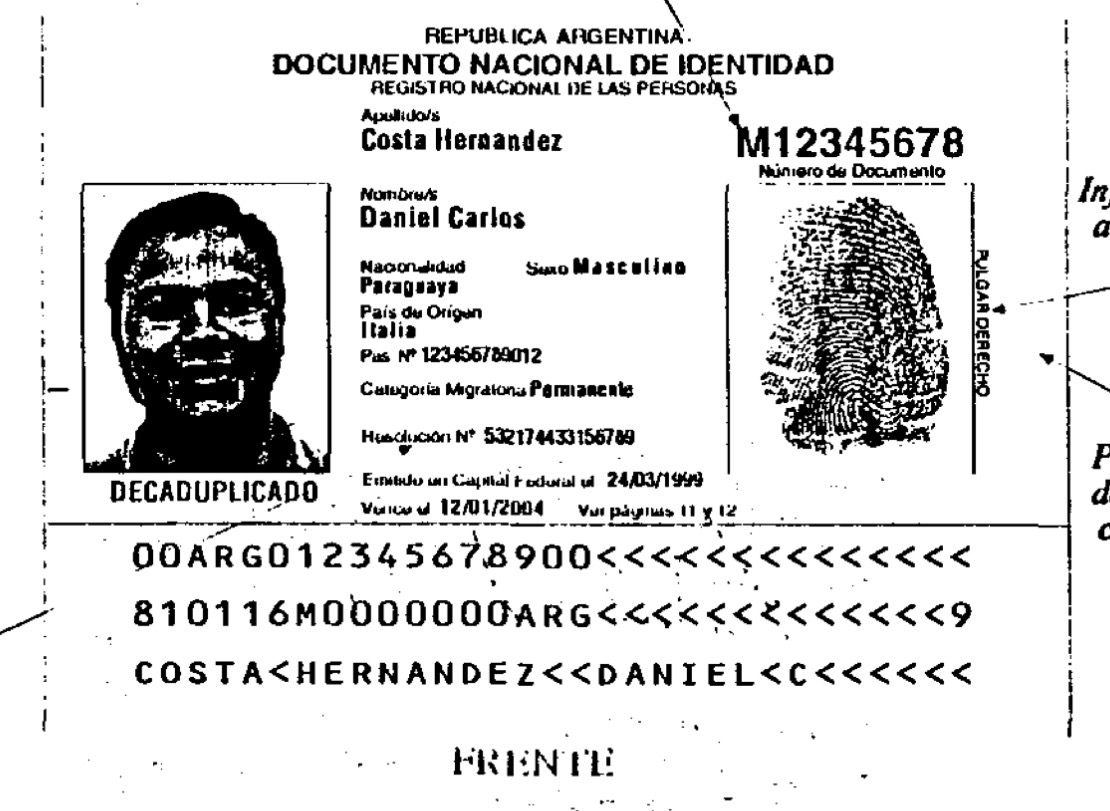
Specimen identity card for a foreign resident using the same fictitious identity.

Official specimen documents published to demonstrate the layout and security features of Argentine identity cards.

Daniel Costa, that his full name appears Daniel Carlos Costa Hernández, is another fictitious identity that appears on Argentine specimen identity documents and related credentials. Unlike María Victoria Villareal, Daniel Costa has generally been used on specific document types rather than as the principal identity across successive generations of the DNI, and had appeared on the first identity cards drafts.
There is also a version of him of Paraguayan nationality, but with a different face.

==== Catalina Fereyra ====
Specimen of Catalina Fereyra shown in the Argentine identity card. It can be seen the inked "ESPECIMEN" word.

On August 2026, Keesing technologies published an an article of the Argentine idenitity card electronic-edition (DNIe) security. In the article it is shown an Specimen of the card like in the Official Gazzete or InfoLeg, but with different features. Such as the face of the dummie, or the fields shown. Another such thing can be seen is the Word "ESPECIMEN", that seems to be printed with ink. Much similar to the Argentine Foreigeers identitity cards, that used to have "EXTRANJERO" legend in red print until 2021.

=== Use ===
The use of fictitious identities serves several purposes such as illustrating the appearance of official documents demonstrating security features publishing specimen documents in legislation, supporting software development and testing, training public officials, and avoiding the disclosure of the personal information of real individuals. The names used on specimen documents do not correspond to the actual individuals whose photographs may appear on some examples, as the images are typically supplied separately for demonstration purposes.

=== Purpose ===
Placeholder identities are used for many pueposes, such as demonstrate document layouts publish legal annexes containing specimen documents, illustrate security features, train government personnel, provide examples for software developers, border authorities and financial institutions. The use of fictitious identities avoids the disclosure of personal information belonging to real individuals while allowing official documents to appear complete.

== Problems and challenges ==
The main issues with the Argentine Identity cards are mainly the price, which increases with inflation and has been reported to be fairly high. Exemption from payment can be made to people with a "Certificado de Pobreza". However, Internet access is required due to the use of TAD (Trámites a distancia).

In the elections of 2023 there were some issues with old documents, such as the old "DNI Card" (delivered with the old blue booklet) marked "NO VÁLIDO PARA VOTAR" (not valid for voting), although the card had later been approved for voting. This also included electoral census issues.

As of May 2026, there were also problems and challenges on validation of the identity cards on many daily-life system, such as banks. This is due the QR code instead of the PDF417 Code.

== Old booklet ==
Earlier Identity cards in Argentina came in the form of paper booklets in a green cover for Argentines, Bordeaux cover for foreigners, much like modern day passports. On the outside, the Emblem of the Argentine Republic Republic as well as the words "Mercosur" "REPÚBLICA ARGENTINA" ("Argentine Republic"), "DOCUMENTO NACIONAL DE IDENITDAD", "REGISTRO NACIONAL DE LAS PERSONAS LEY 17.671" ("NATIONAL REGISTRY OF PERSONS LAW 17,671"), are embossed. Inside the cover page there was a place for votes proofs and addresses change. They also had the legends written "MENOR DE 16 AÑOS"(under 16 years) and "EXTRANJERO" (foreigner), respectively. Inside the cover page there is a notice to the bearer:

La presentación del documento nacional de identidad, expedido por el Registro nacional de Personas, será obligatoria en todas las circunstancias comprendidas en esta Ley, sin que pueda ser suplido por ningún otro documento de identidad.

Art. 13 - Ley 17.671.
Todas las personas de existencia visible o sus representantes legales, comprendidas en la presente Ley, consulares o que se habiliten como tales, el "cambio de domicilio", dentro de los treinta días de haberse producido la novedad.
Art. 47 - Ley 17.671.

Which translates to:

The presentation of the national identity document, issued by the National Registry of Persons, will be mandatory in all circumstances covered by this Law, and it cannot be replaced by any other identification document.
Art. 13 - Law 17,671.
All persons of visible existence or their legal representatives, covered by this Law, consular or those who enable themselves as such, must report a "change of address" within thirty days of the occurrence of the change.
Art. 47 - Law 17,671.

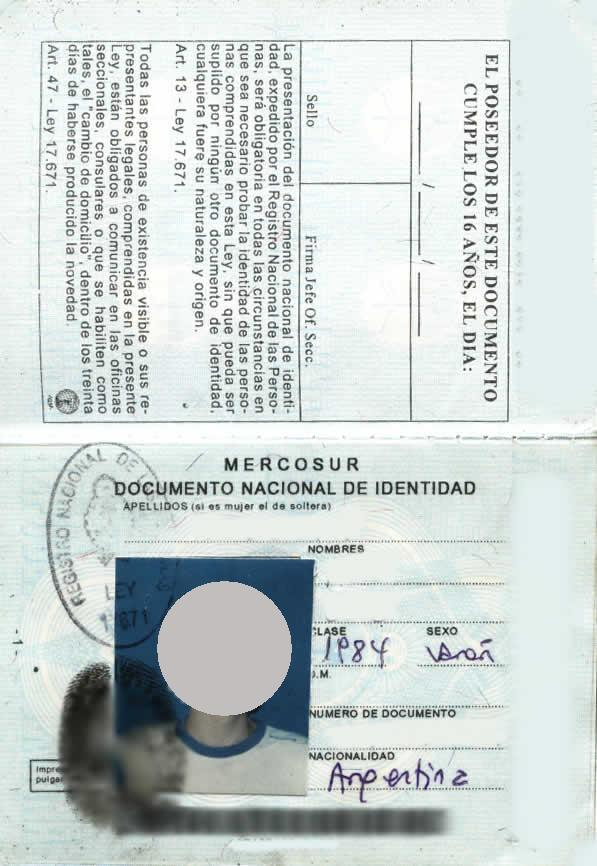

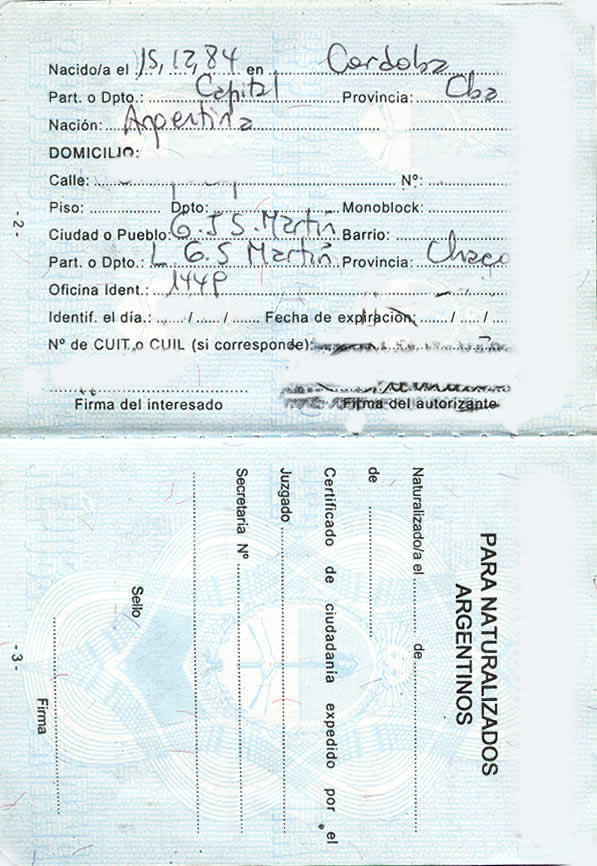

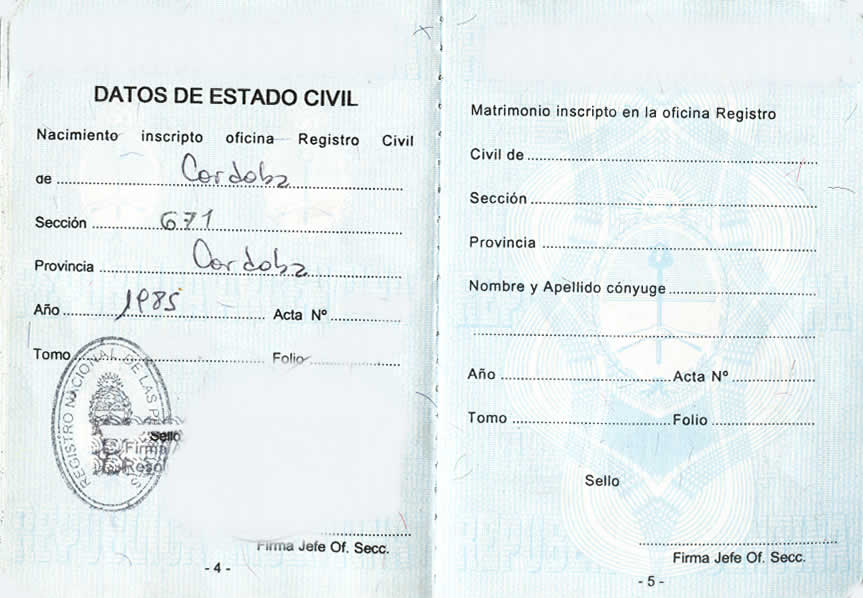

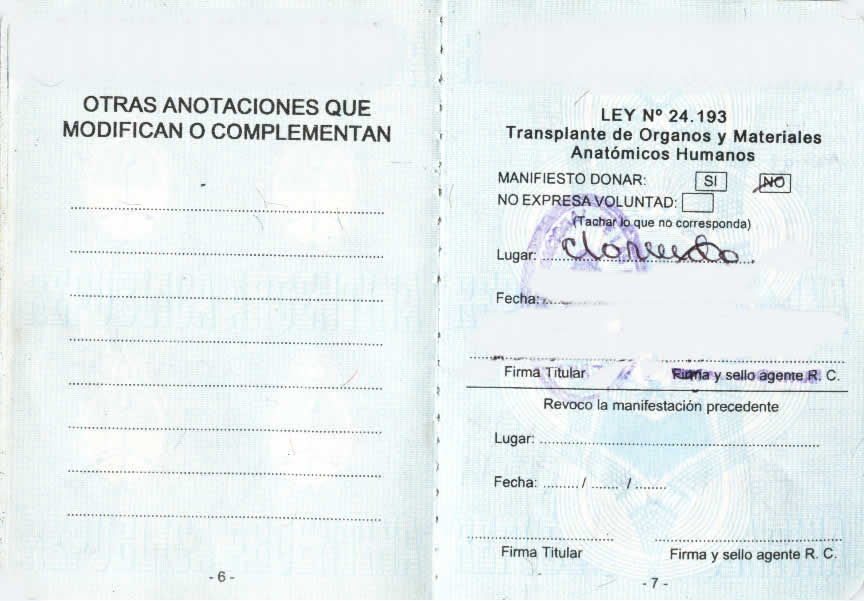

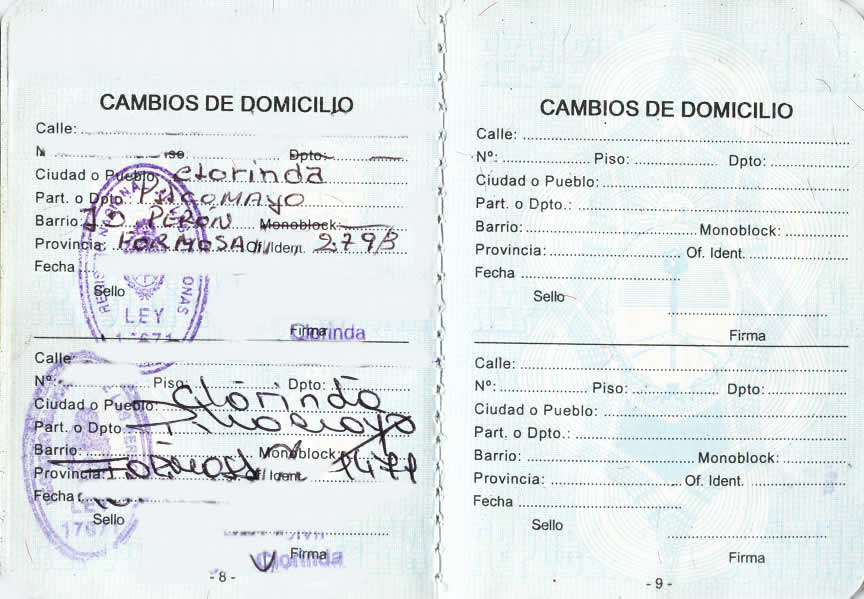

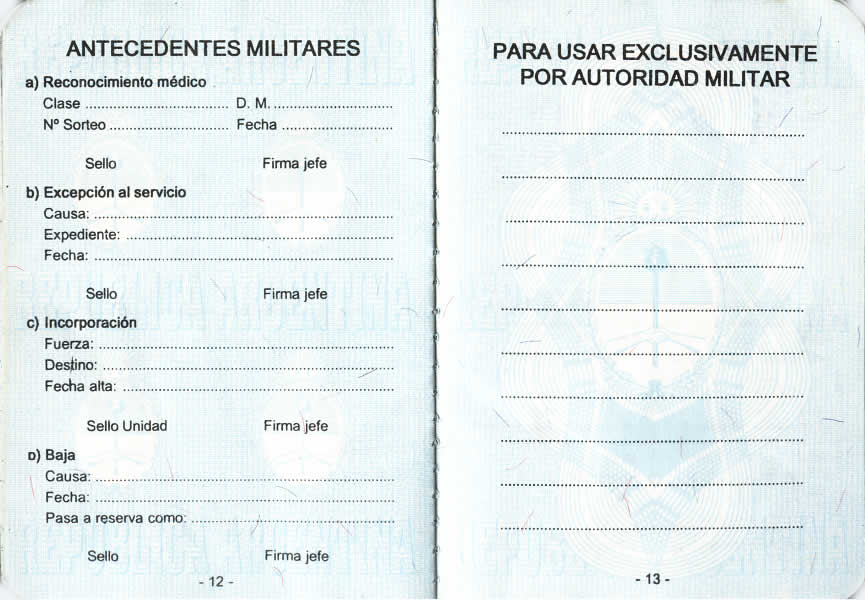

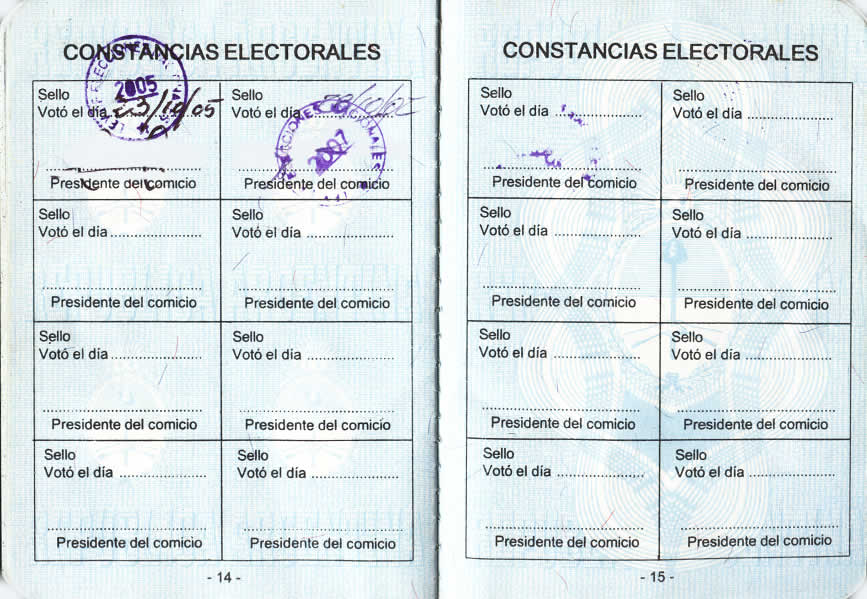

=== Digital Booklet ===
In 2009 the Argentine Identity card became a blue booklet, made of a plastic, with new features. Most parts were "digitized", with anti-counterfeiting measures. However, some kept "handwritten" style in some parts. (Note: However, the identity cards for newborns ("DNI Cero años" were still handwritten at all. They lost validity at April 1, 2017) An additional card version was also provided for Argentine residents at least 16 years old.

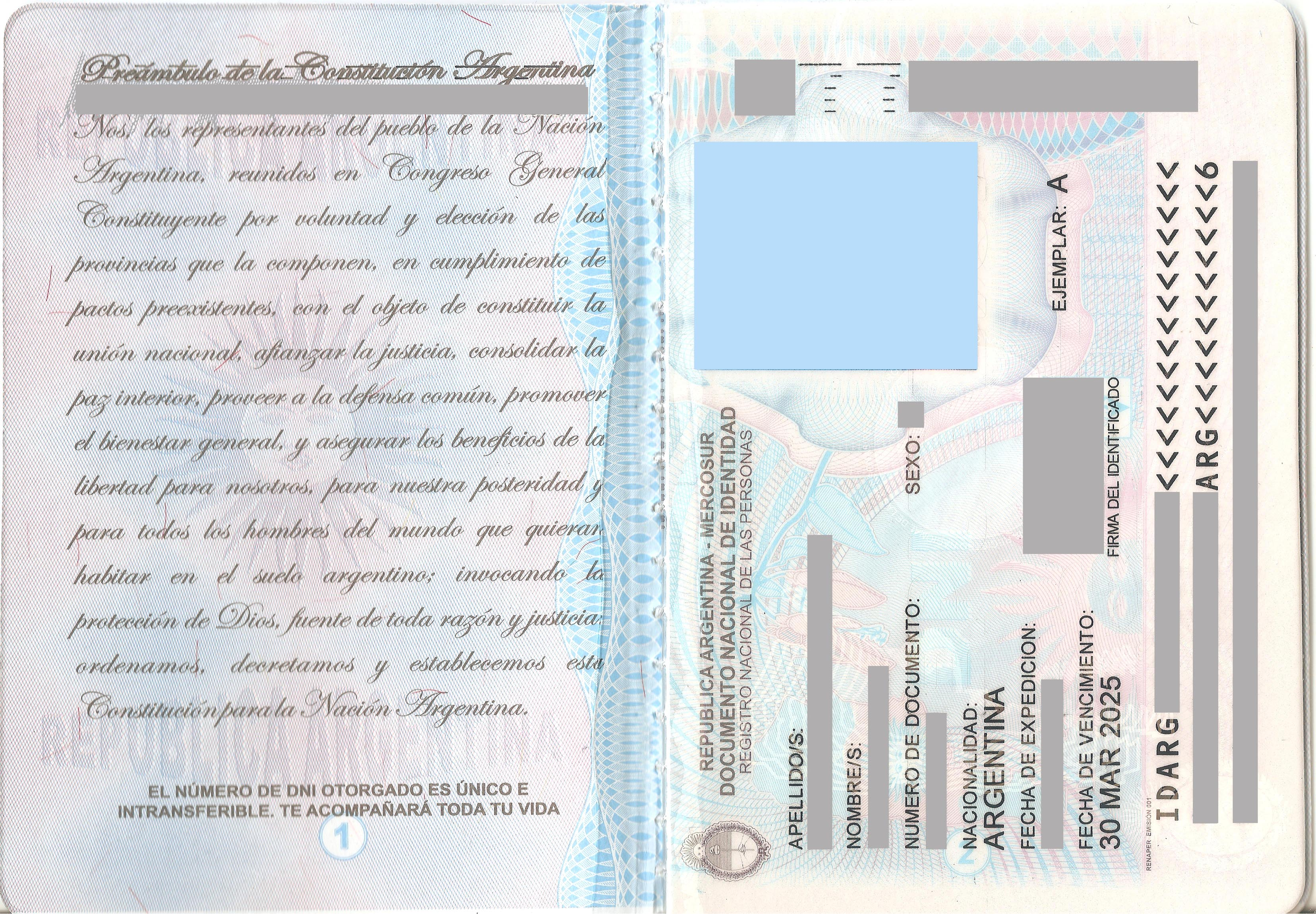

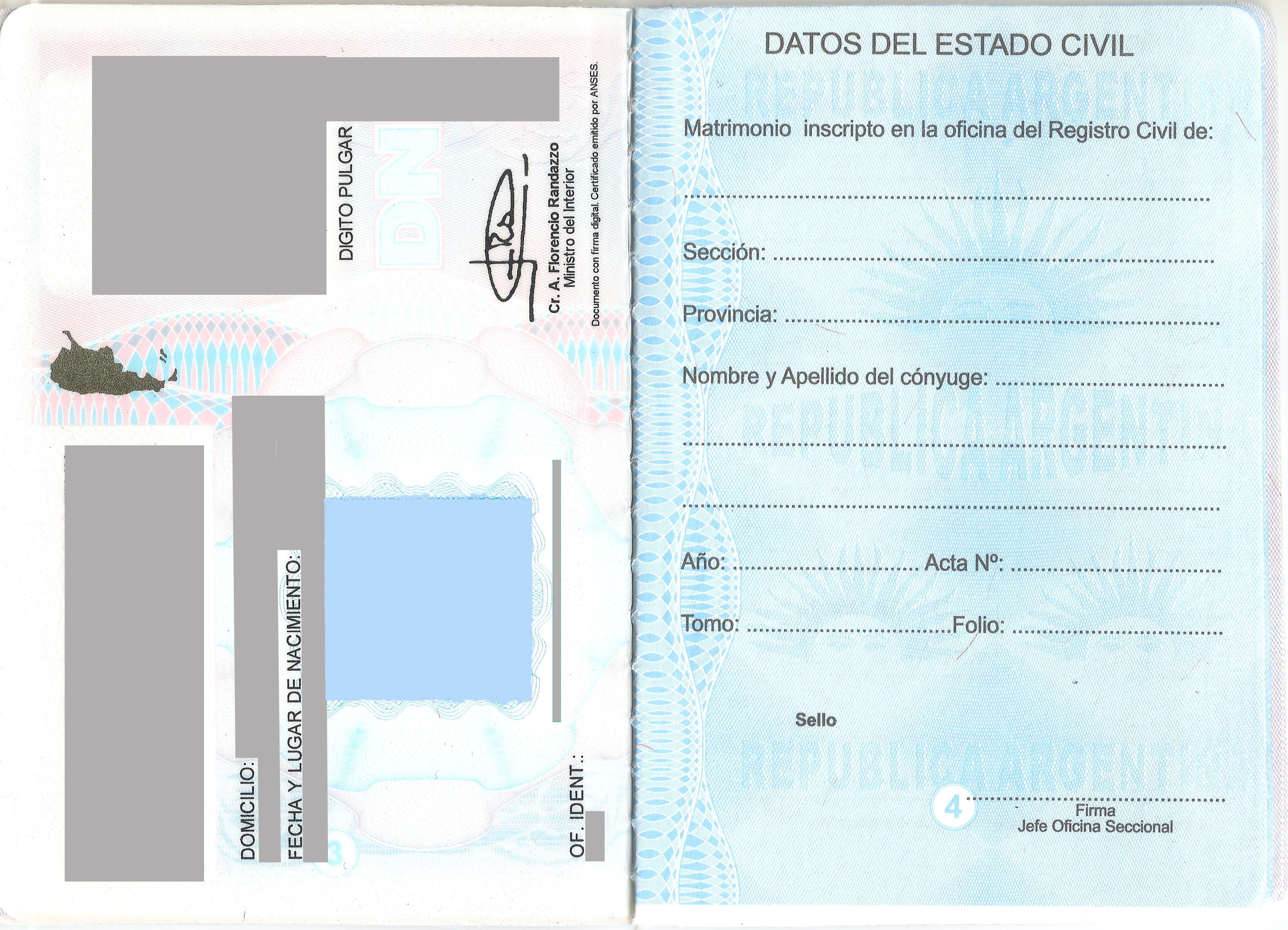

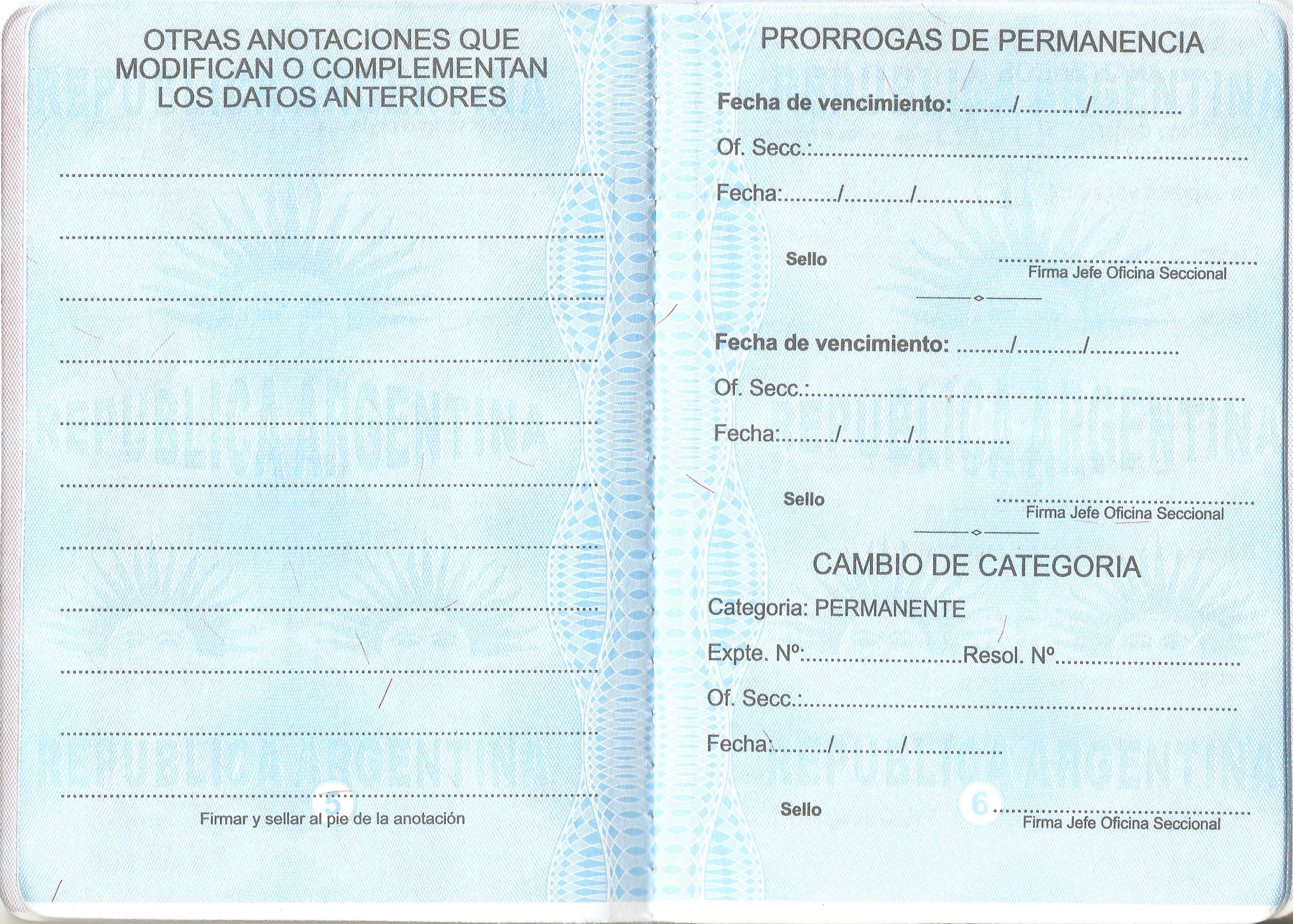

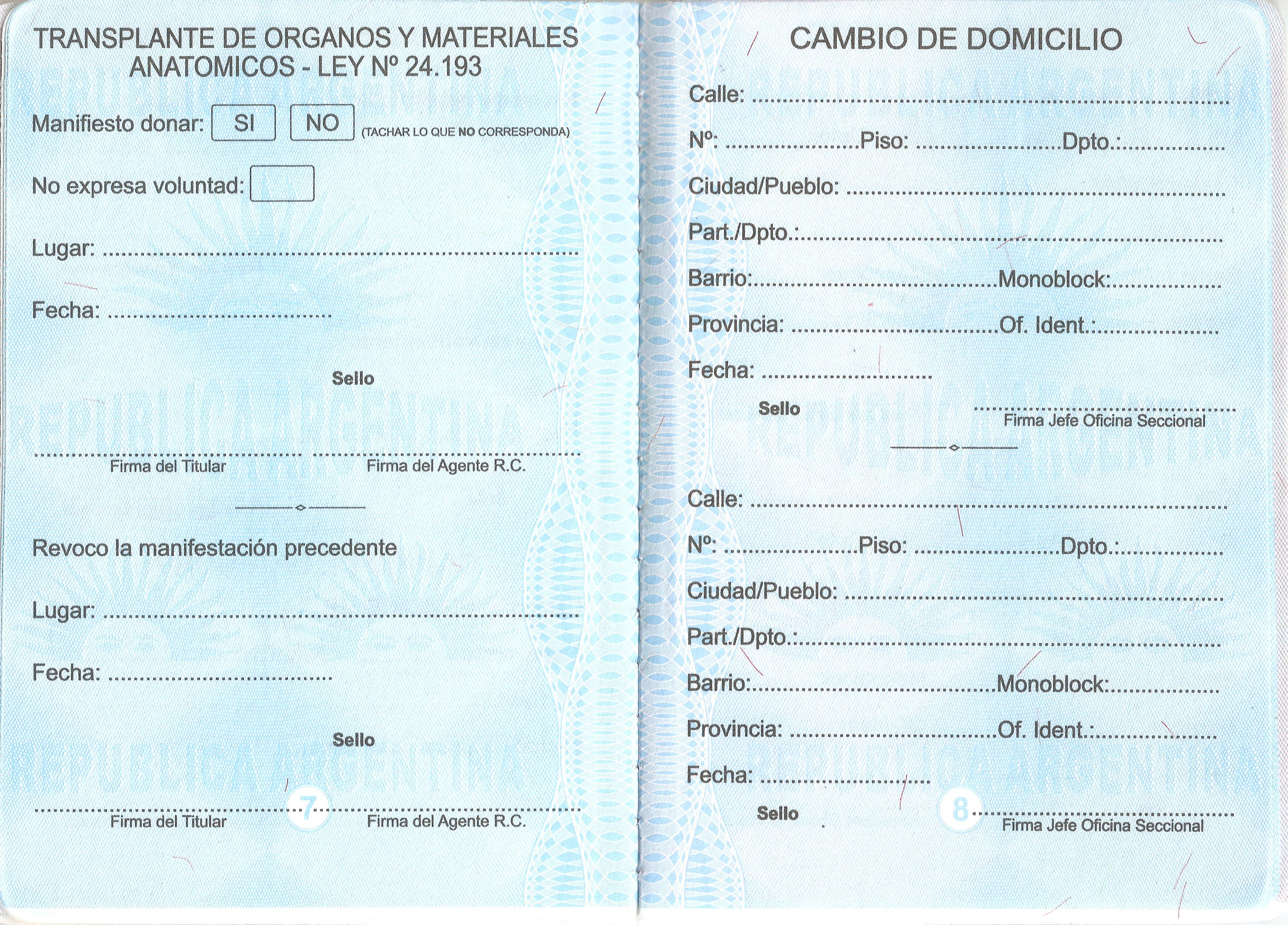

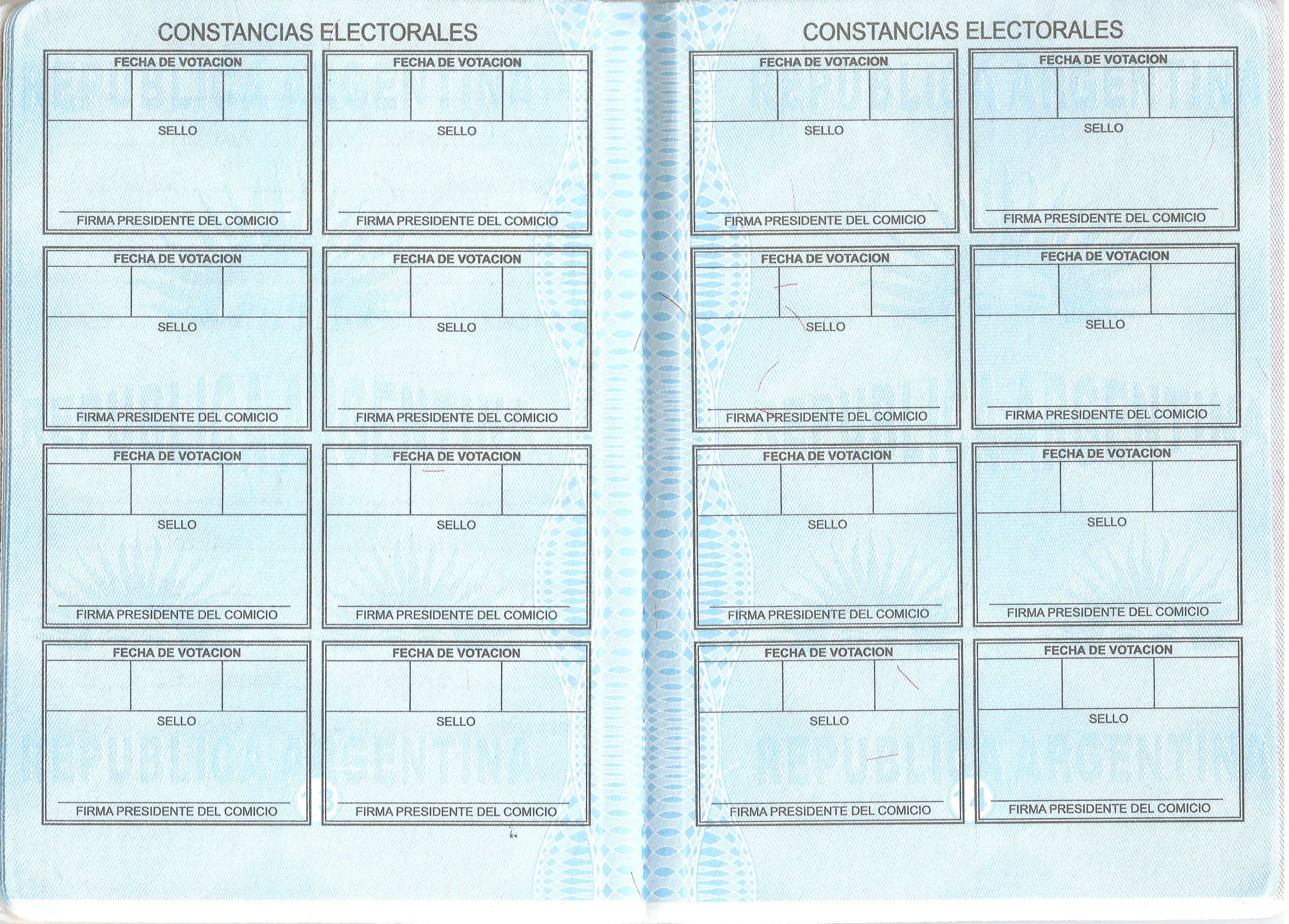

== Gallery ==
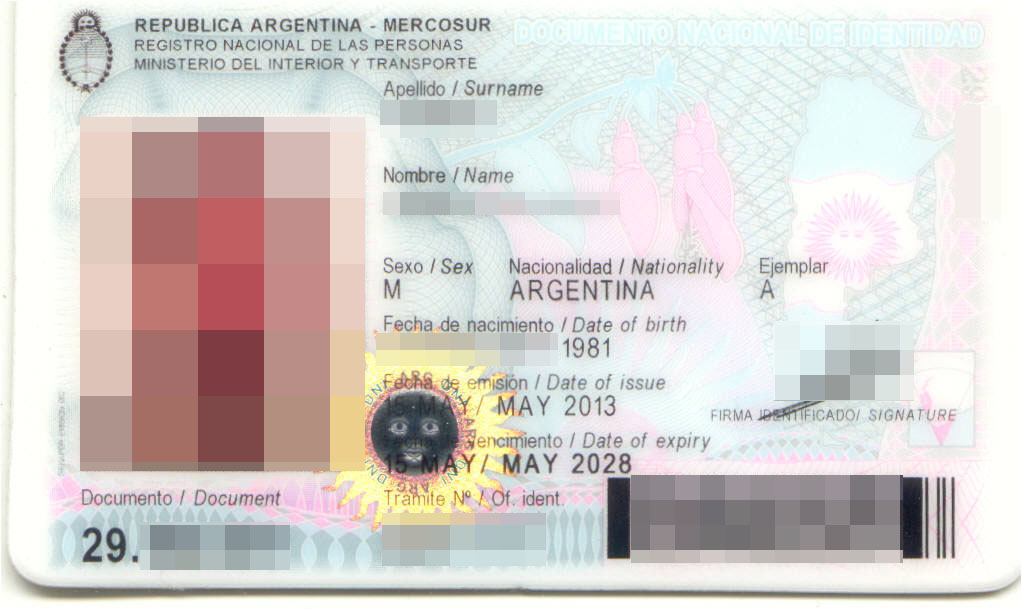
Front side of previous version of DNI card, issued 2012–2020

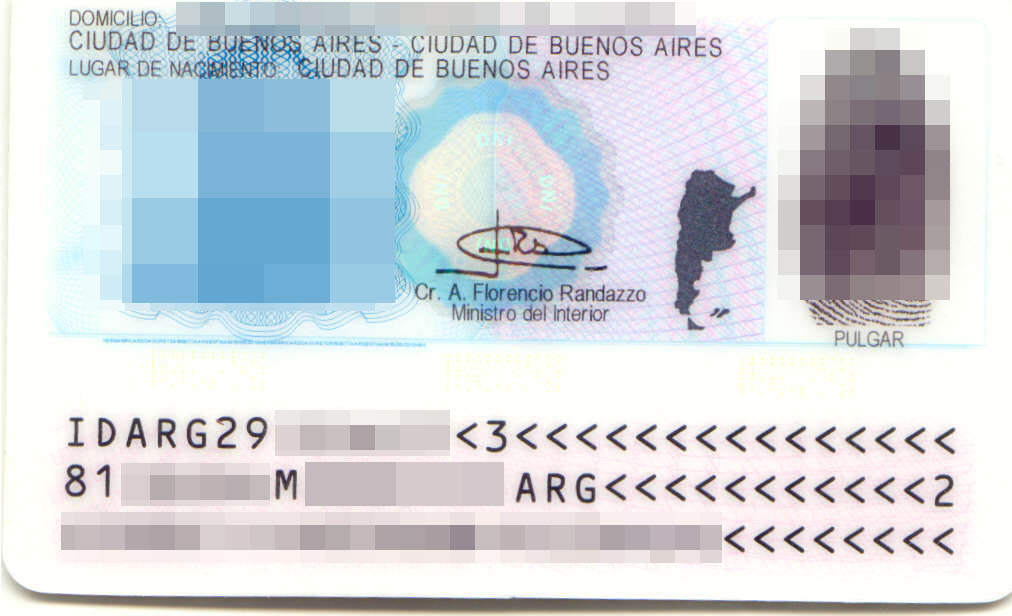
Back side of previous version of DNI card, issued 2012–2020

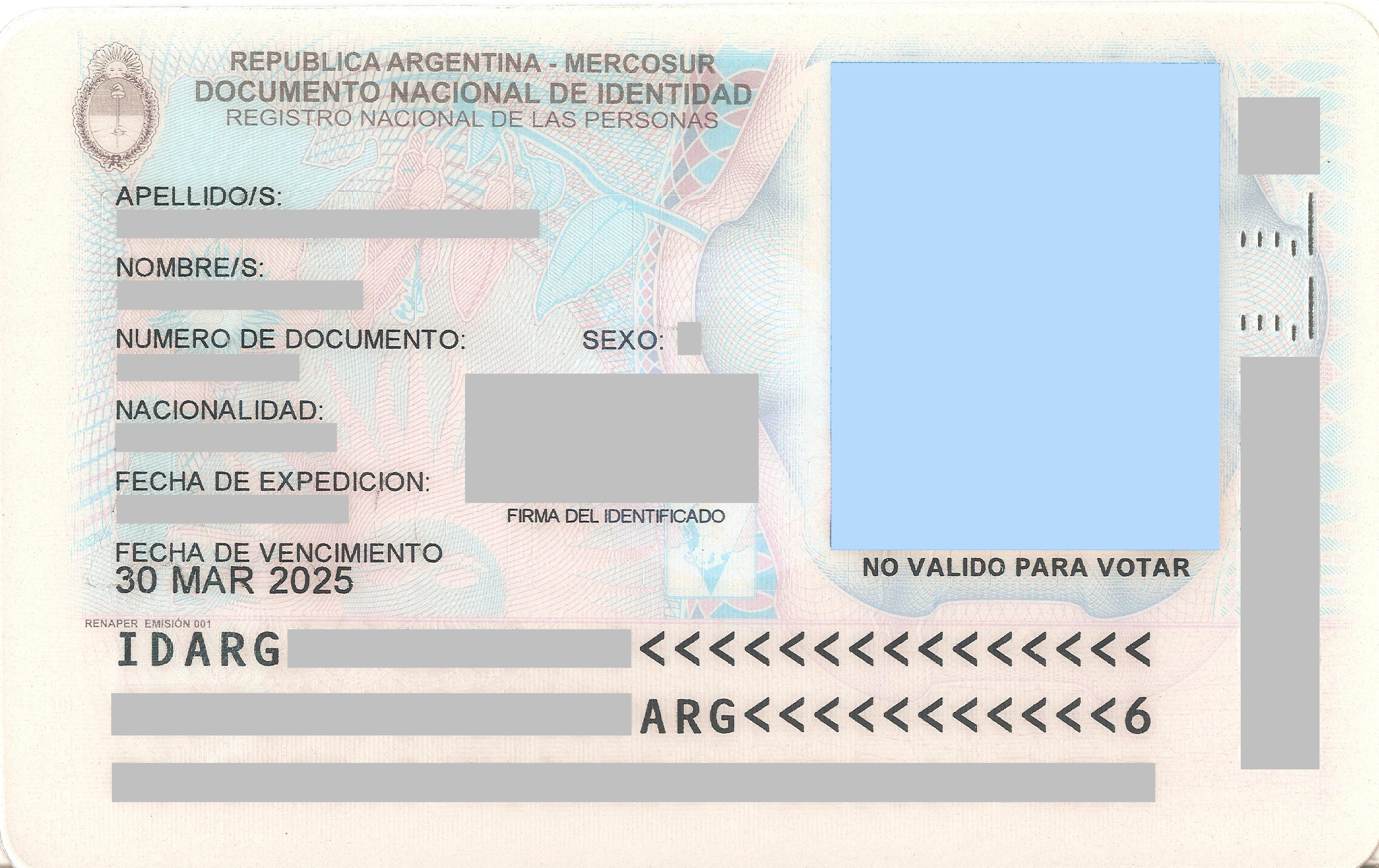
Front side of previous version of DNI card, issued 2009–2012

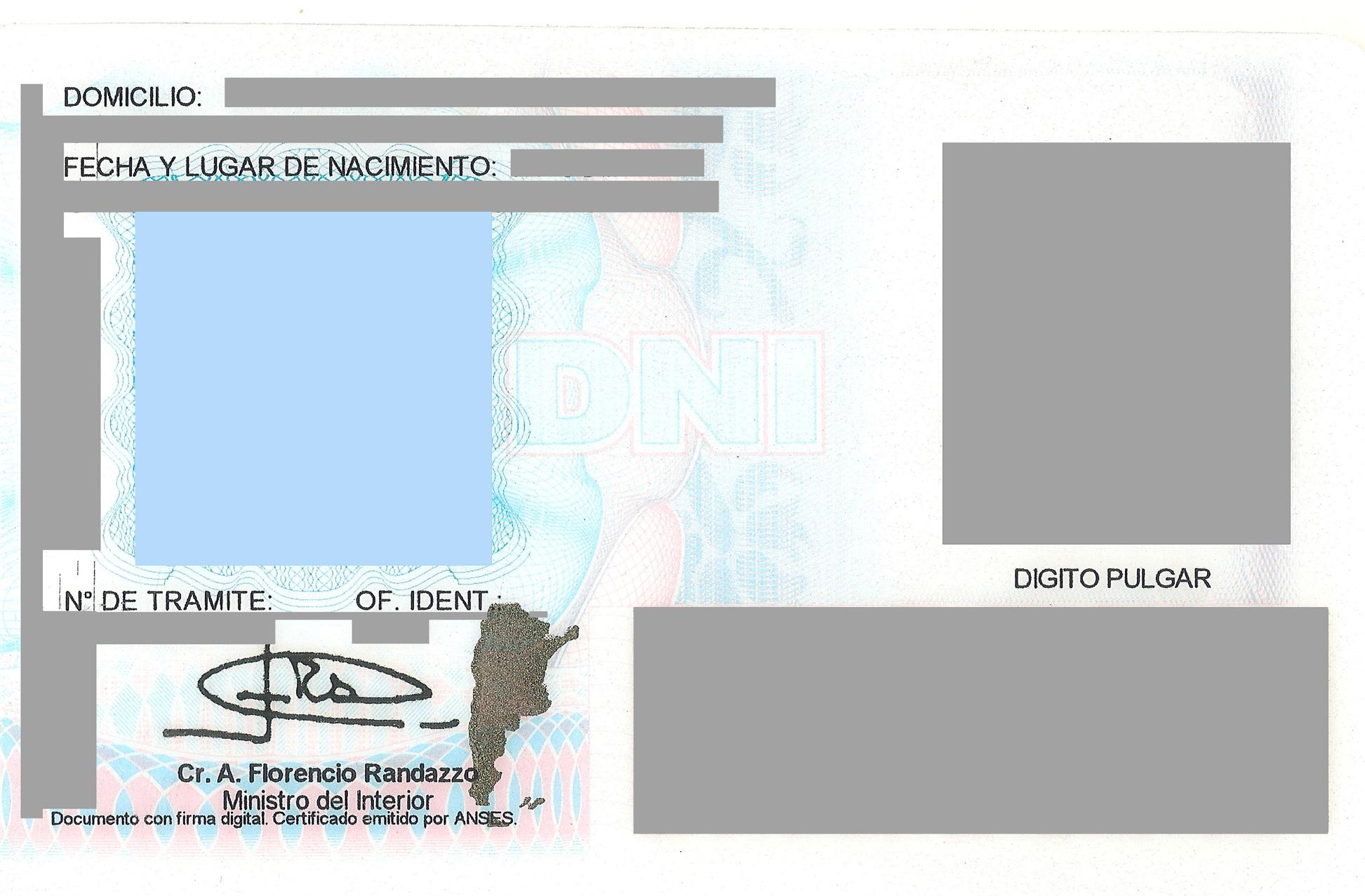
Back of oldest version of DNI card, issued 2009–2012

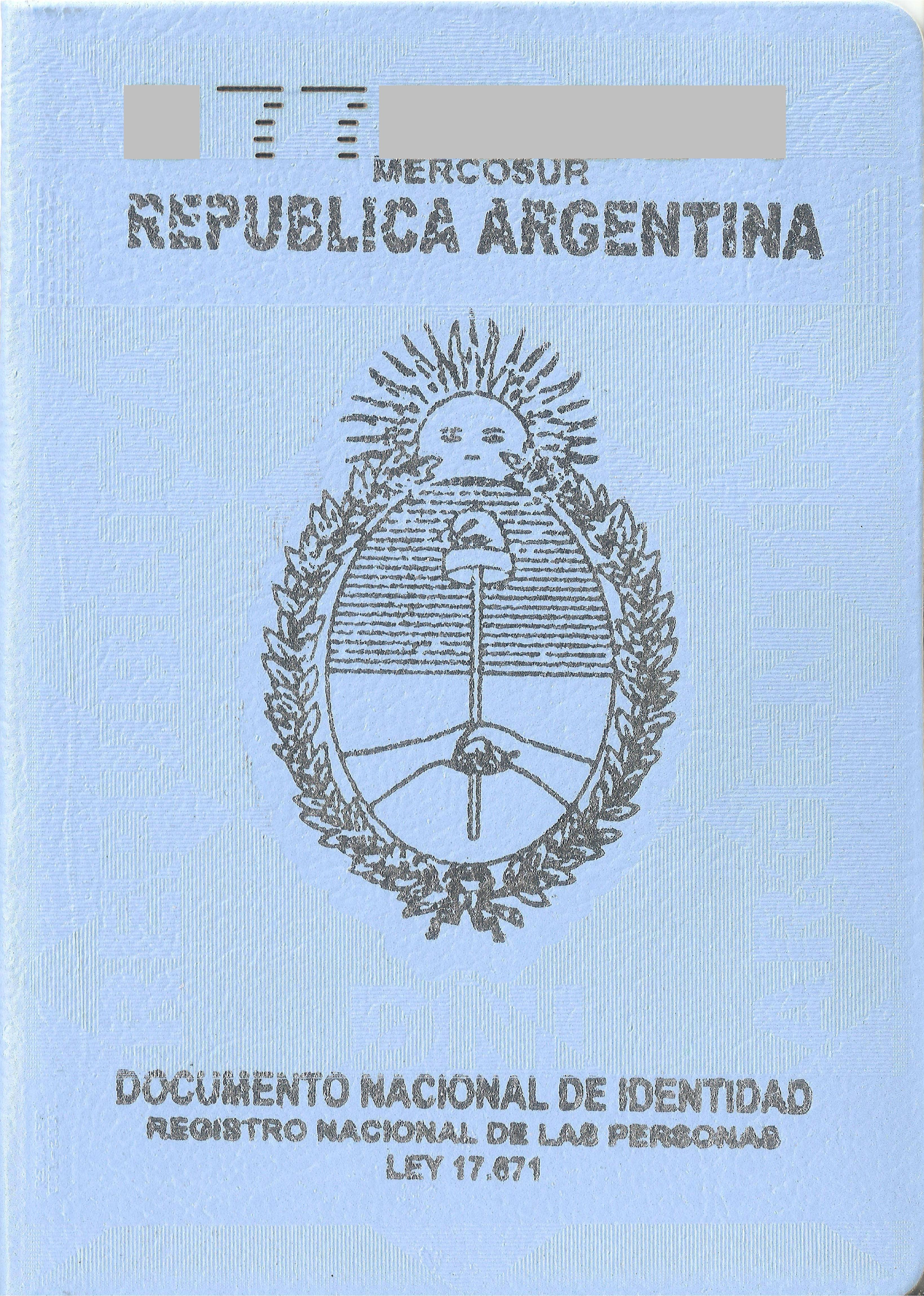
DNI blue booklet, issued 2009–2012

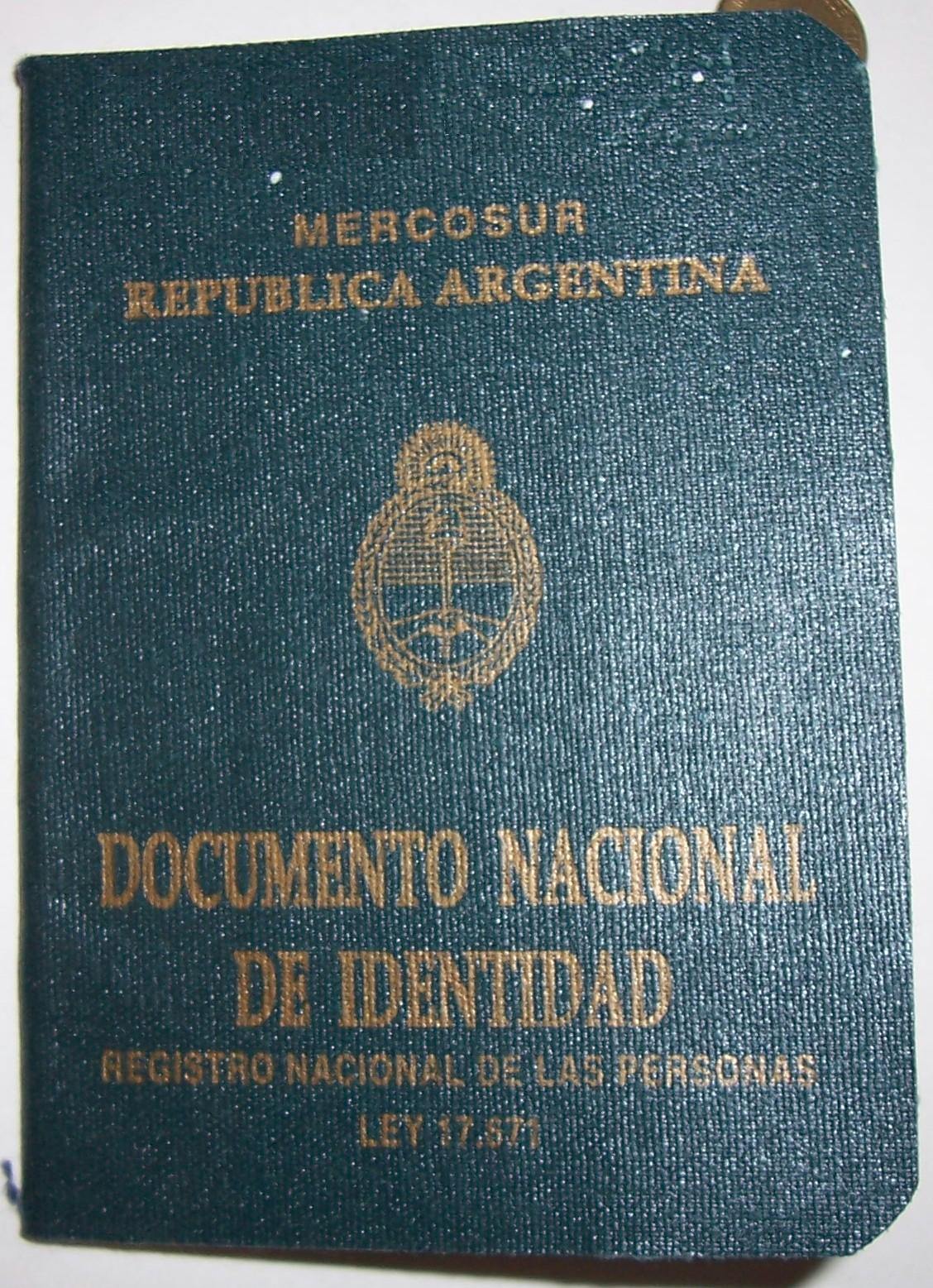
Previous green libreta version of the DNI, issued 1968–2009, until the new DNI cards began to be issued

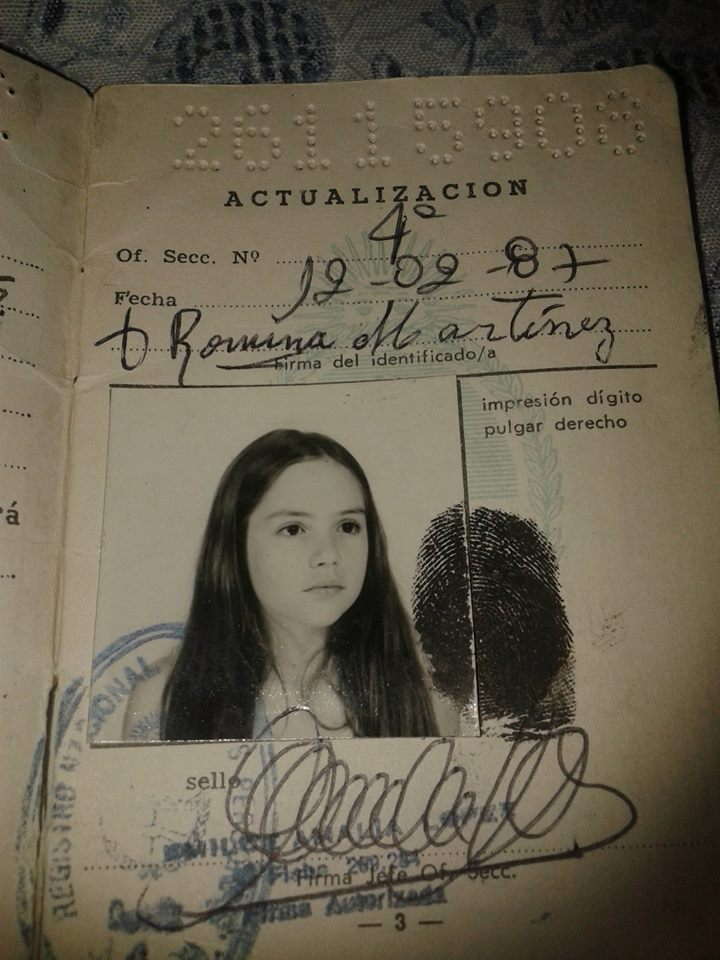
Example of an old Argentine Identity card age update

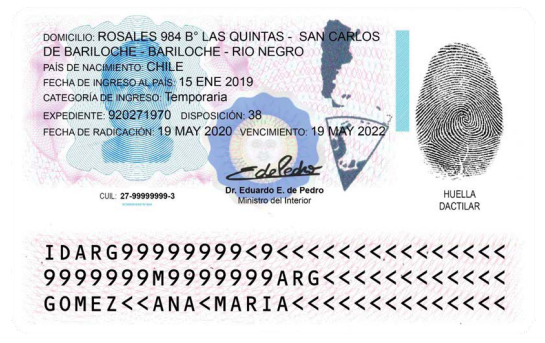
Pre-biometric resident DNI specimen for a temporary foreigner.

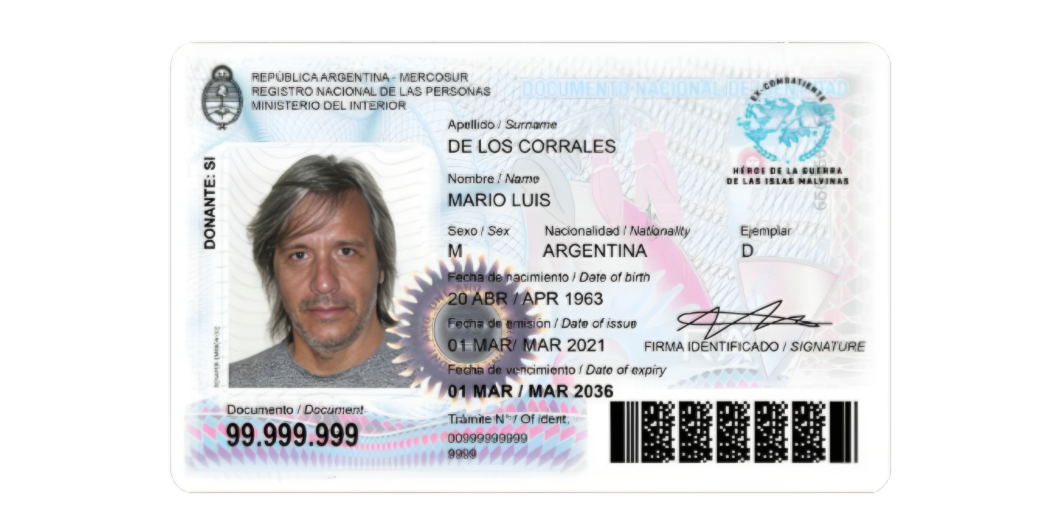
DNI issued since 2023 for Falkland Islands veterans (Issued until December 2023)

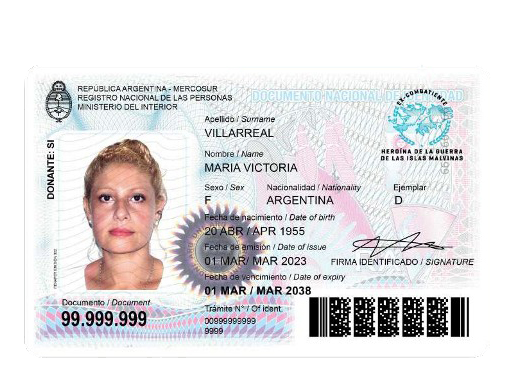
The Argentine DNI (Documento nacional de identidad) with Falkland Island issued to Women veterans (Issued until 2023).

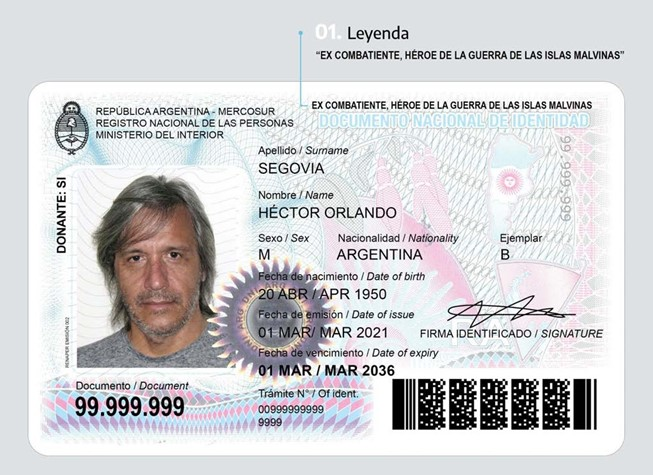
Older Argentine identity cards for Falkland island veterans. Intead of a "Distinctive seal", it just had a legend (up to 2021).

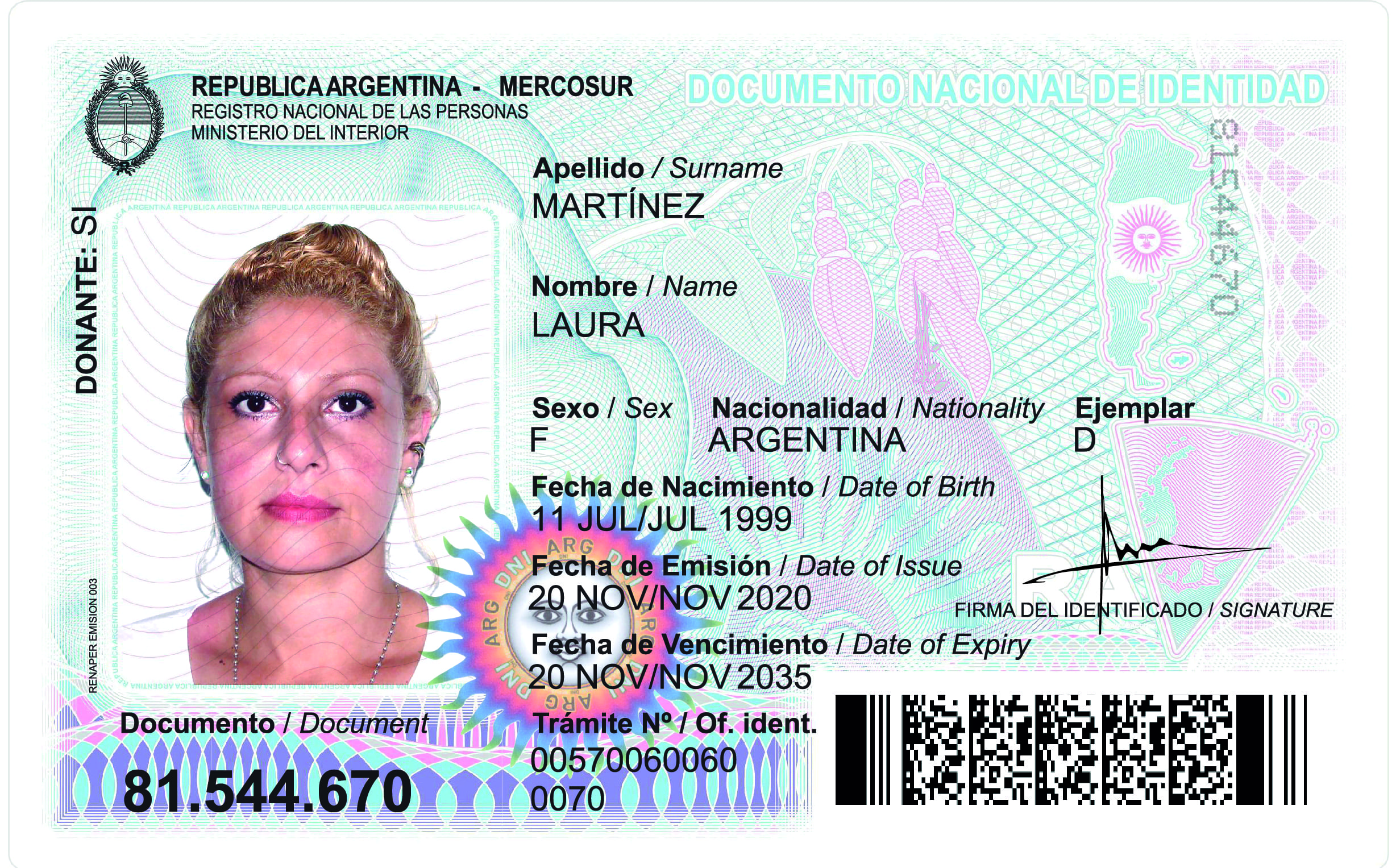
Pre-biometric Argentine DNI, which included Argentine Antarctica on the map.

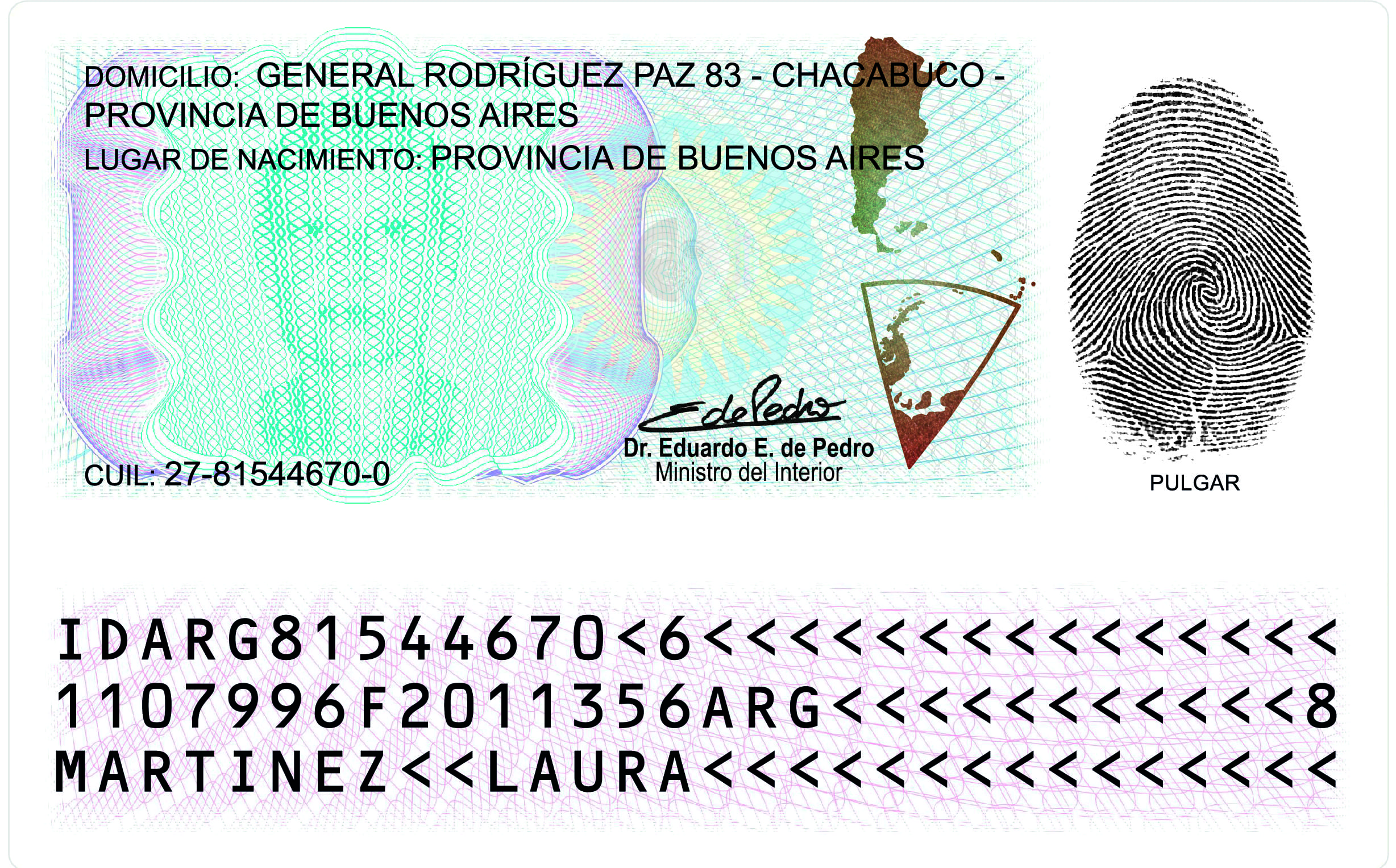
Reverse of the pre-biometric Argentine DNI, which included Argentine Antarctica on the map.

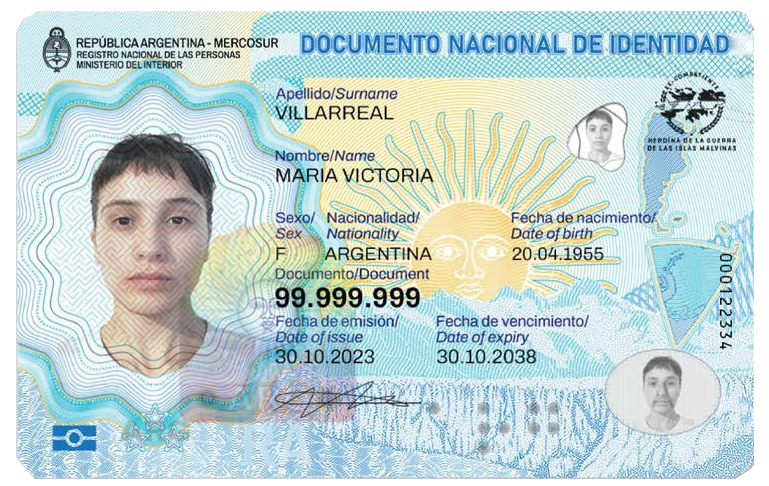
Argentine biometric DNI for Falkland Islands veterans, protype since December 2023.

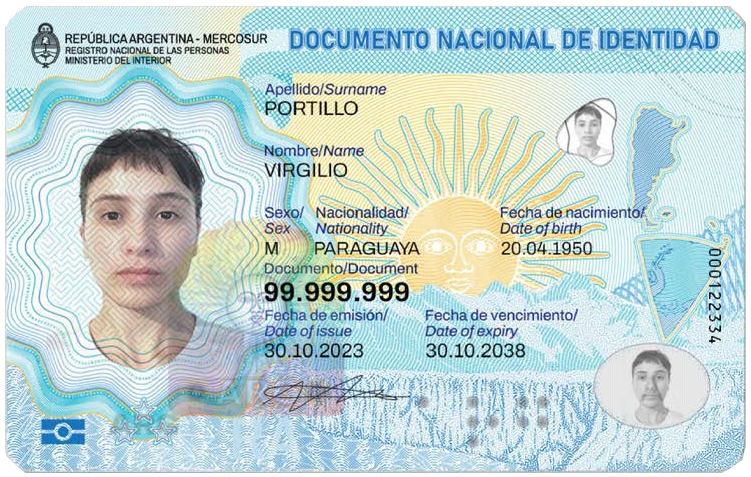
Protyped 2023 version identity card for citizens and foreigners

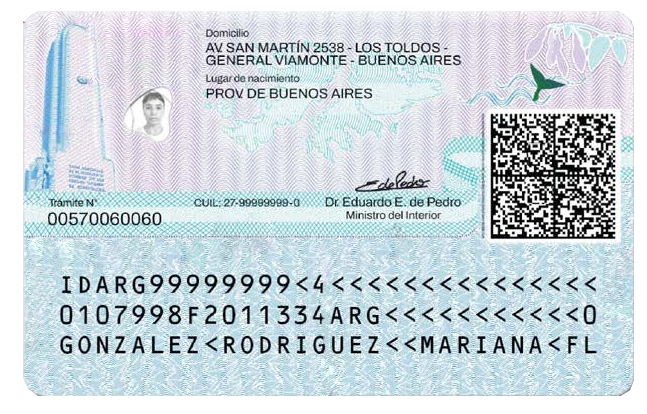
Back of the Identity card for Nationals

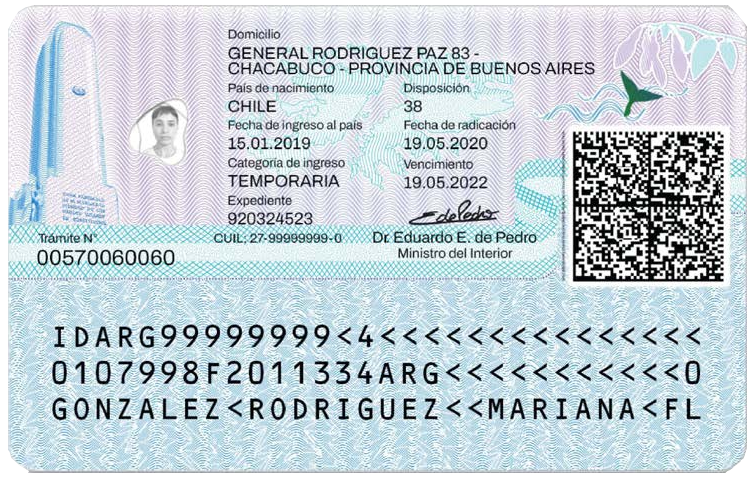
Specimen of Argentine DNI for a temporary citizen (Back).

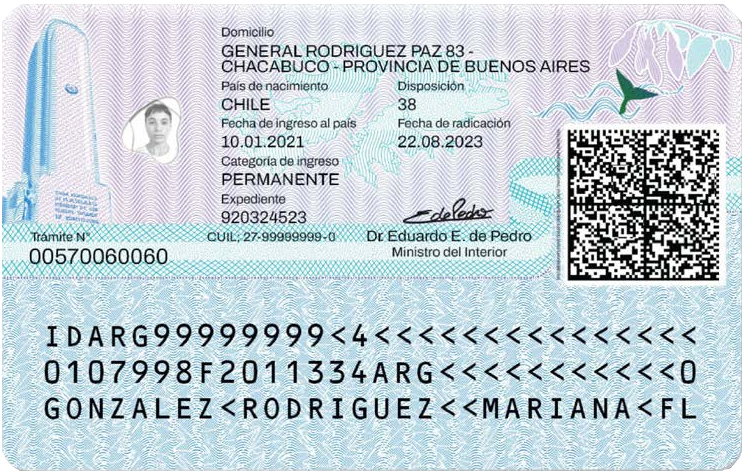
Specimen of Argentine DNI for a permanent citizen (Back).

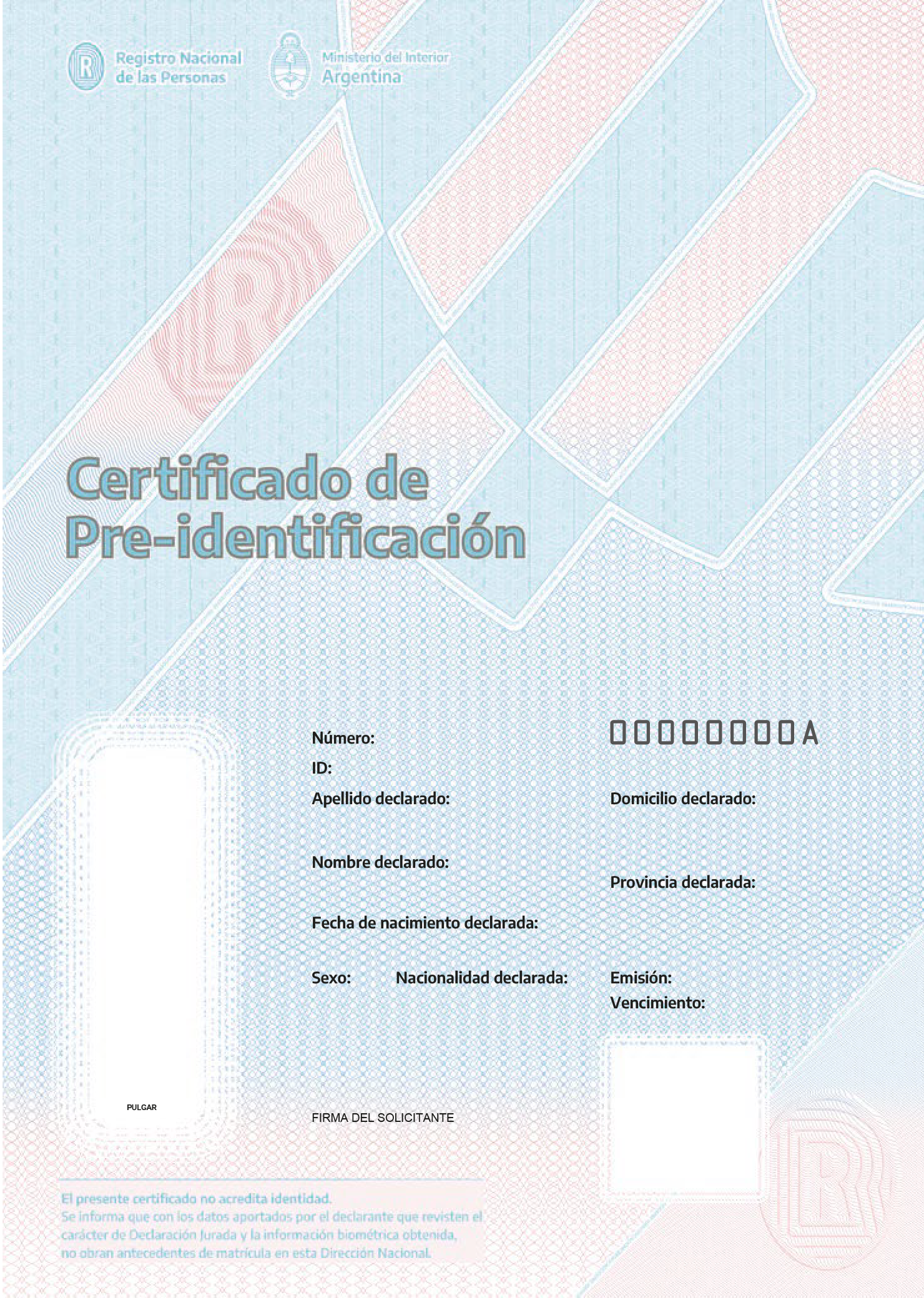
Specimen of the "Pre-Identitfication certificate", a document used for people born in the country that cannot get the regular Identity card (temporal durability).

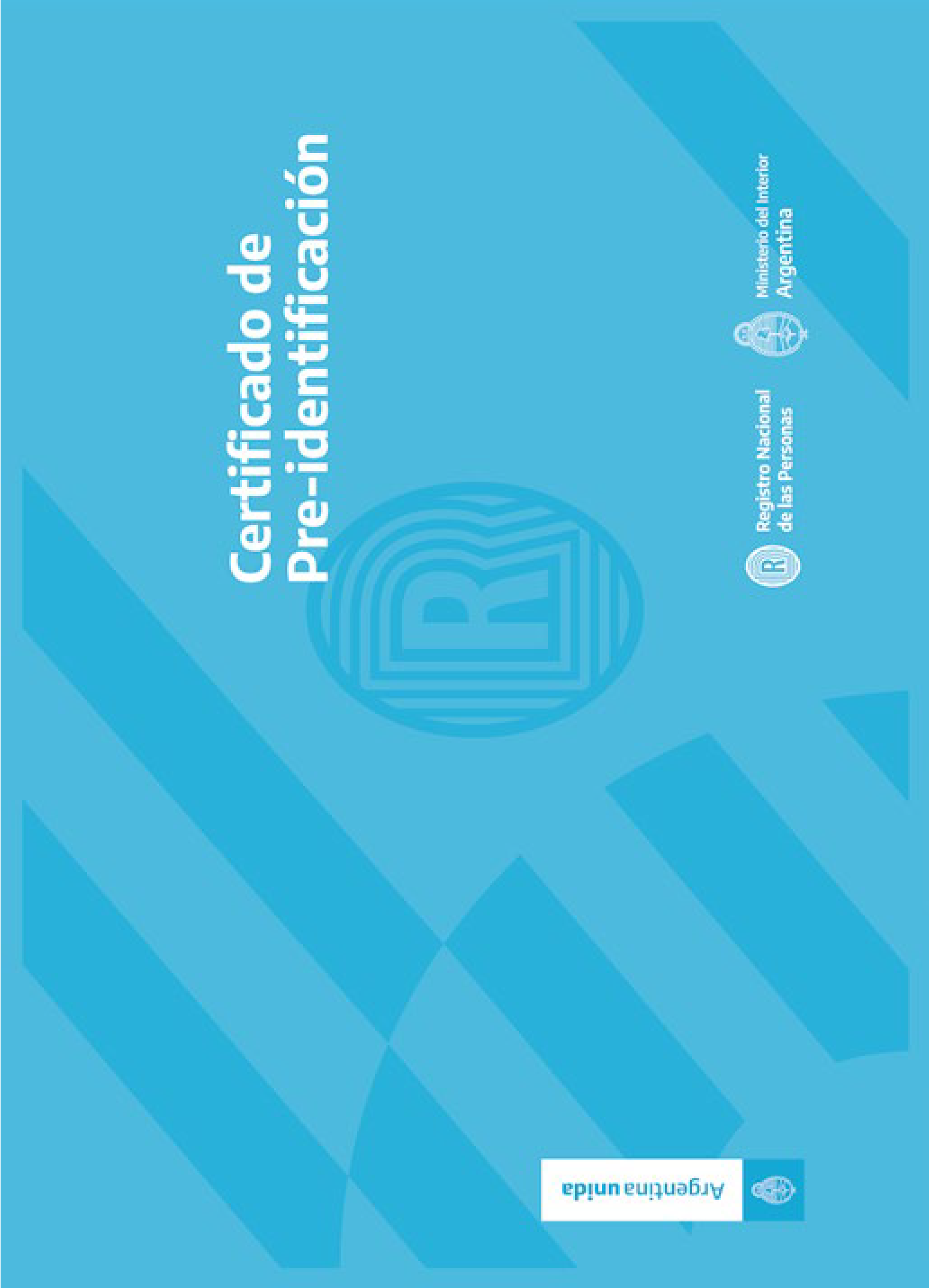
Back of the Argentine CPI.

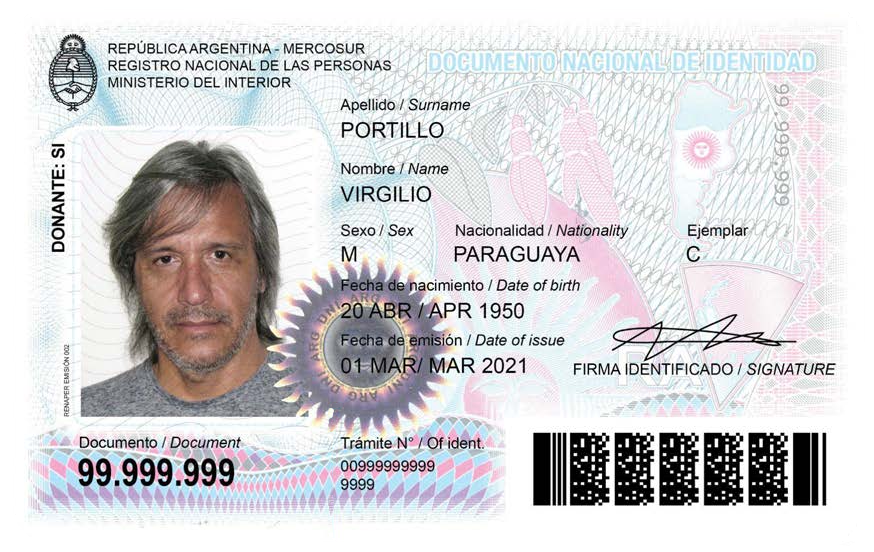
Virgilio Portillo specimen identity on the identity card.

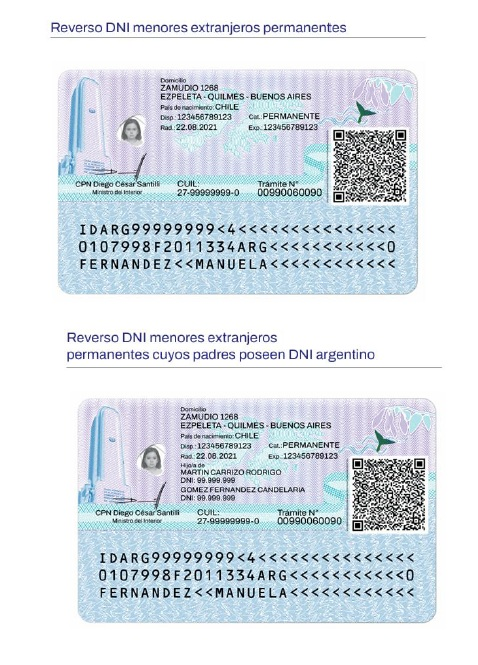
2026 specimen identity card

== See also ==
- Argentine passport
- Argentine Foreigner's Identity card (old identity document for non-citizens citizens living in Argentina (not used anymore)
- Argentine nationality law
- Visa requirements for Argentine citizens
- Visa policy of Argentina
