= Alphanumericals =

Set of alphabetic and numeric characters

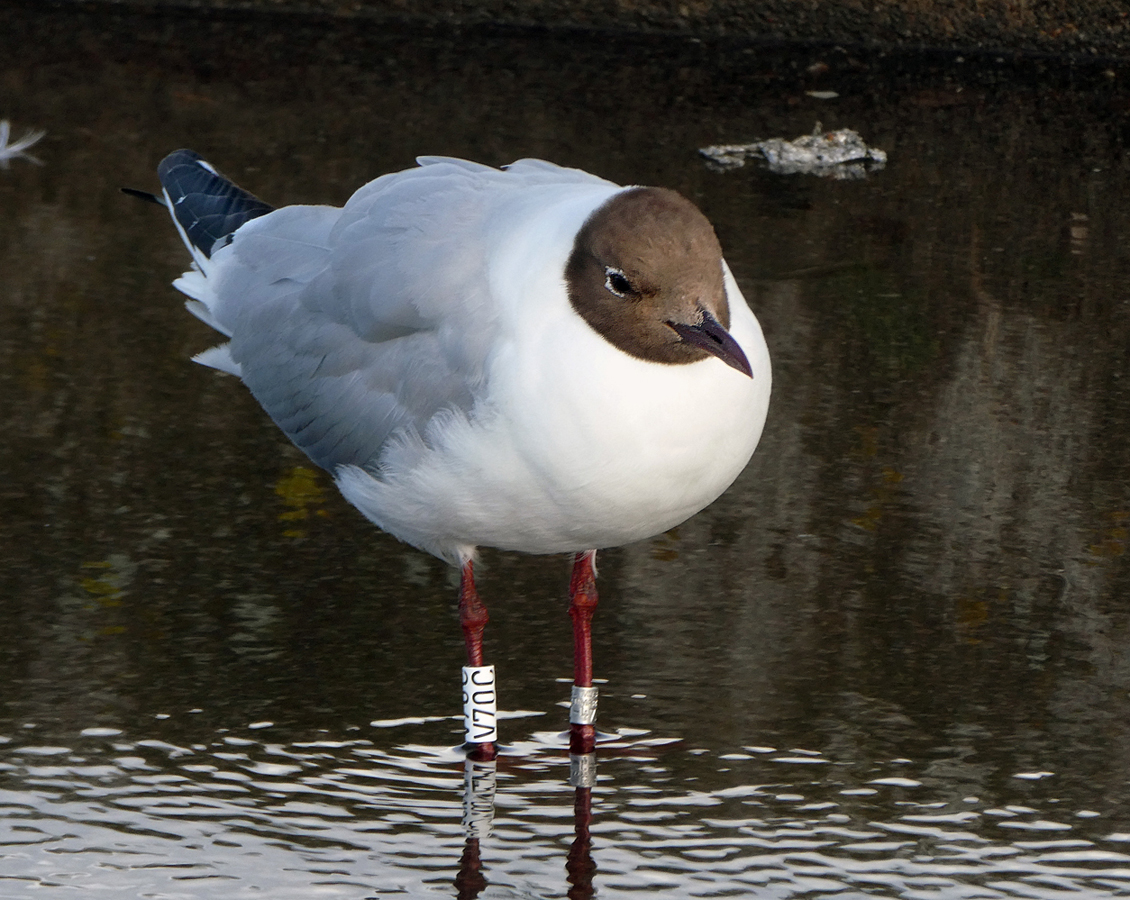
A black-headed gull ringed with an alphanumeric plastic ring that makes it easier to read from a distance.

Alphanumeric characters or alphanumerics are characters belonging to the English alphabet or Arabic numerals. It includes both lower and uppercase characters. The complete list of alphanumeric characters in lexicographically ascending order is: 0123456789ABCDEFGHIJKLMNOPQRSTUVWXYZabcdefghijklmnopqrstuvwxyz.

Non-alphanumeric characters are often known as "special characters".

Different alphanumeric characters have similar appearances, such as I (upper case i), l (lowercase L), and 1 (one), and O (uppercase o), Q (uppercase q) and 0 (zero). Other similarities can include 5 and S, Z and 2.

== See also ==
- Alphanumeric brand names
- Alphanumeric keyboard – Data input device
- Alphanumeric shellcode – Plain text used to obfuscate machine code
- ASCII – Character encoding standard
- Binary-to-text encoding – Representation of binary data as text
- Enclosed Alphanumerics – Unicode block of typographical symbols
- ISO basic Latin alphabet – 26 letters in two cases broadly used in international communication
- Latin script in Unicode – Characters from the Latin script encoded in the Unicode Standard
  - Basic Latin (Unicode block) – U+0000 until U+007F This block corresponds to ASCII. It includes some non-alphanumeric characters
- Mathematical Alphanumeric Symbols – Unicode block U+1D400 until U+1D7FF
- List of typographic symbols and punctuation marks
