= Credencial Cívica =

Civic Credential (Credencial Cívica)
- Type: Identity card
- Issued by: Electoral Court
- Purpose: Voting
- Valid in: Uruguay
- Eligibility: Uruguayan citizenship
- Cost: Free
- Website: www.gub.uy/corte-electoral/

The Civic Credential (Spanish: Credencial Cívica) is a compulsory Uruguayan official document that identifies citizens authorized to vote. Issued by the Electoral Court, it is the only document that certifies the identity of the voter in electoral instances.

== Procedure ==
The civic credential is obtained after the mandatory registration that every Uruguayan citizen over 18 must complete before the Electoral Court, the body which oversees the electioneering process. Once the document is issued, the citizen is registered in the "National Civic Registry", an electoral registry of citizens with the right to vote.

The credential must be obtained by all Uruguayans of legal age, and in accordance with the nationality law, it can be obtained by those born abroad with at least one Uruguayan parent, by legal citizens and non-legal citizens foreigners with habitual residence in the Republic for fifteen years.

Each credential contains the holder's registration information: the full name, a series of three letters and order number –based on their place of residence–, a right thumb-digit impression and a side-view photo.

== Use ==
Since voting in Uruguay is mandatory in accordance with Article 77 of the Constitution of the Republic, the civic credential serves to identify the voter before the commissions receiving votes in general, municipal and primary elections, referendums and any type of electoral process, including the elections of the Banco de Previsión Social, and the university elections of the University of the Republic. In addition, with the identification information of the document, the citizen can subscribe to popular initiatives calling for referendums and constitutional reforms.

== See also ==
- Uruguayan passport
