= Free migration =

View that people may live in any country

Free migration or open immigration is the position that people should be able to migrate to whatever country they choose with few restrictions.

== Spiritual perspectives on migration ==
Through numerous situations and encounters, immigration can be a test of mental fortitude rather than physical ability. In Buddhism, a bodhisattva is considered to be a guide to awakening and to the Pure Lands. "The Buddha declares that we are all bodhisattvas destined to attain full Awakening. It seems that each of us, then, is engaged in 'spiritual immigration'. The Buddha asserts that everyone is a bodhisattva, or a 'spiritual immigrant', who must attain various virtues which ultimately leads to prajnaparamita, or 'transcendent wisdom'. The existence of Buddhas and Mahasattvas—'great beings' who have achieved a high level on the path to awakening—have created various branches of belief like Mahayana Buddhism, which is a form of 'spiritual immigration'. "Buddhism is a type of immigration from the world of suffering to nirvana....We are all immigrants who, paradoxically, are seeking to and the land in which we already dwell". In terms of 'spiritual immigration', the path of the bodhisattva is a change of mental capacity rather than cosmic location.

According to Buddhist teaching, the purpose of a 'spiritual immigration' is to help guide the individual onto their future path. The Pure Land is the state of untainted mind: reaching this land of purity requires persistent effort and practice. Along the journey, individuals learn to envision their future as a land of opportunity. The intention of the pure land is to assure that the individual achieves their personal goals in life—the betterment of oneself in order to reach nirvana. Alongside these goals, practitioners also learn about the relationship of 'self' and 'others', resulting in the renewal of all beings. The concept of the pure lands enforces the idea of 'spiritual immigration' as a form of mental encouragement.

Migration is a spiritual journey that establishes a point of communication between the human and divine. Religious figures migrate from one place to another as immigrants: "In Christianity, God migrated to this world in the form of human Jesus; the Hindu God Krishna descended to earth to become a charioteer, a human being (Bhagavad Gita 1:20-47); and the Buddha 'becomes Awakened' when he became a wanderer and a stranger". Adherents believe that religious figures have travelled from an unpurified state to a purified state: Buddha traveled from his privileged life to a life of poverty to gain divinity and knowledge; therefore divine figures like Gautam Buddha viewed migration as purification. The Qur’an states that "they could migrate from their oppressed positions to another land of God".

The doctrine of Hijrah suggest that freedom of movement is a human right as well as a duty to God. Globalization affects religious perspectives on migration which seek to prevent the "destruction to the sanctity of human life and dignity". Religious figures like Buddha and Jesus practised "a theology of migration". According to adherents, immigrants should have the same rights as legal residents because world religions believe everyone is divine. It is also mentioned in the Qur’an that "strangers are entitled to the equal distribution of wealth". Despite the acquisition of wealth in verse 8:41, the Qur’an states that "know that one-fifth of your battle gains belongs to the God and the messenger, to close relatives and orphans or to the needy and travellers (strangers).”

According to Collier and Strain, the Roman Catholic Church has been helping migrants for decades. The Christian faith receives a sense of justice for migrants from Abrahamic faith traditions. Catholics follow these guidelines to help immigrants: "for all persons on the move". The reasons to help those on the move were established in 1952 when leaders of the Roman Catholic Church published written material that reinforced the teachings of the church. One of the quotes from the Bible used to justify hospitality is "when an alien resides with you in your land, you shall not oppress the alien. The alien who resides with you shall be to you as a citizen among you; you shall love the alien as yourself, for you were aliens in the land of Egypt: I am the Lord your God" (Leviticus 19:33).

Strangers or those on the move should be treated equally, no less than anyone else. The modern nation state should open its borders because people may be migrating due to unfavorable circumstances. The Catholic Church believes everyone has a right to migrate to support their families; this idea of free migration allows "the human person [to precede] the state".” In some circumstances, the Church provides assistance to migrants and refugees. Some Catholic organizations offer educational activities on the legal process of immigration to the United States. Other types of aid include spiritual companionship, ESL classes for those who want to learn to speak better English, basic hygiene, and food. The Roman Catholic Church believes that helping those in need enables the growth of the human spirit.

Before the Columbian exchange, there was an open border policy in the Americas that gave Native Americans access to travel freely and have open trade with other cultures. There was widespread trade among many First Nations that created free movement and travel for many foreigners. At the time, there was little border control, which allowed migrants to travel to various areas to settle. Immigration policy shifted towards control and nationalism after 1492. In the 20th century, immigration policy solidified borders in America, but many Native Americans advocated free movement and hospitality towards strangers. Native Americans historically have welcomed strangers with hospitality, sometimes making them relatives through an informal adoption system. Migration in America can be understood through the religious and cultural perspectives of Native Americans.

== Law and politics ==
Many nation states have agreed and disagreed on the topic of open borders and free migration, with some countries allowing people to travel freely from country to country and state to state without the risk of deportation or punishment. The consensus within the open borders debate is to “establish a view of migration that reflects the liberal commitment to the equal moral worth of all people which applies to a truly global view of migration.”

Various ideas have been applied to a global view of migration, such as the ideas of other journalists such as Johnathan Wolff and Avnir De-Shalit to migration. Wolff and De-Shalit's state that the use of law and ethics is a positive factor in the debate over free migration. The debate of free migration does not apply to a specific country but extends beyond, and continues on to a broader spectrum for introducing a freedom of movement amongst all people, for all countries. However, this concept is especially significant to the places that experience the most migration—including both source and recipient countries or states.

Free migration is not limited to a certain time period, but has been more relevant and controversial in recent years, especially in the United States. In the U.S., it has become a more controversial topic since 9/11. Free migration is a concept to consider when comparing basic human rights and migration. "Constraining movement in most cases is therefore, unjustified and immoral". The topic of free migration is not a matter to be only exclusively debated amongst national governments of varying nations, but a worldwide discussion for all people of all nations on the debate of open borders and free migration. In that case, nations and people from all over the world can learn from each other where everyone is involved in the attempt to come to a just conclusion and solution to the problems surrounding both immigration and free migration alike.

Free Migration has been slowly restricted throughout recent history due to the inevitable progression of society, causing more independent societies to create tighter laws, policies, and regulations concerning immigration. With nations closing themselves off and shutting their borders from non-residents, it is difficult for free migration to become secure, as well as having members of society prioritize an institutional issue such as this. Immigration officers and agents must maintain a code of conduct based on policy to provide equal treatment to any and all immigrants. Officers must put their political views behind them and revert to policy law; leaving behind their personal moral conflicts and ethics to abide by law and policy. Political philosophers focus on free movement as a human right and aid for those in poverty or serious global inequality.

Although there is not a necessary definition for something considered to be morally, ethically, or legally accepted in a society, everyone has an individual connection to what may be considered good or bad for society. The United States government has placed many strict laws on immigration that it proposes will produce a better immigration system. Other countries, through United Nations consensus, allow a minimum two year system for refugee relocation, with other countries such as Canada and Switzerland operating within a four-year system.

According to London School of Economics political theorist Chandran Kukathas, immigration control is a threat to freedom and national self-determination. He argues, "immigration control is not merely about preventing outsiders from moving across borders. It is about controlling what outsiders do once in a society: whether they work, reside, study, set up businesses, or share their lives with others. But controlling outsiders-immigrants or would-be immigrants requires regulating, monitoring, and sanctioning insiders, those citizens and residents who might otherwise hire, trade with, house, teach, or generally associate with outsiders."

== Arguments against free migration ==
Arguments against free immigration are usually economical, cultural or security-related. Hans-Werner Sinn, president of Ifo Institute for Economic Research has declared "Welfare states are fundamentally incompatible with the free movement of people" which was similar to Milton Friedman statement "It's just obvious you can't have free immigration and a welfare state". Some arguments are nationalistic or xenophobic, or ones similar to arguments against free trade, favoring protectionism.

== Argument for free migration ==
=== Economic considerations ===
According to John Kennan's (2012) data simulations (collected in multiple countries to simulate the effects of open borders), there would be large economic gains between Mexico and the United States of America through the implementation of open borders. Liberal economic reasoning advocates for open borders to prevent economic inequality between countries where country A is more efficient than country B due to restrictions on immigration creating production efficiency gaps between the two countries. Labor share data estimates that there would be more economic gains through free migration between countries. These gains are expressed through the economic and labor growth in the country along with economic gain for foreign and resident workers in that country.

Economic simulations show that migration lowers the real wage for both countries receiving and sending immigrants; however, the effect of this decrease is based on the goods and services consumed by an individual. According to Kennan “these gains are associated with a relatively small reduction in the real wage in developed countries, and even this effect disappears as the capital–labor ratio adjusts over time.” Therefore, the number of workers in both receiving and sending countries would double by the current population of workers. Although the two are not the same issue, free migration is similar in spirit to the concept of free trade, and both are advocated by free market economists on the grounds that economics is not a zero-sum game and that free markets are, in their opinion, the best way to create a fairer and balanced economic system, thereby increasing the overall economic benefits to all concerned parties. Political philosopher Adam James Tebble argues that more open borders aid both the economic and institutional development of poorer migrant sending countries, contrary to proponents of "brain-drain" critiques of migration.

Notwithstanding noteworthy differences among these political ideologies, many libertarians, liberals, socialists, and anarchists advocate open immigration, as do Objectivists.

Some free market economists believe that competition is the essence of a healthy economic system, and that any short-term negative impact on individual economic factors that is caused by free migration is more than justified by the prospects of long-term growth for the economy as a whole. Whilst not defending fully open borders, political philosopher Adam James Tebble argues that more open borders aid both the economic and institutional development of poorer migrant sending countries, contrary to proponents of "brain-drain" critiques of migration.

== Examples of free migration ==
=== Free migration of war/political refugees ===
During the Cold War, a migration paradox arose in which some of the communist states forbade emigration, while the "Free World" would freely accept the defectors. This policy persists for Cubans and the Hmong, who are both allowed particular forms of free immigration to the United States based on their automatic refugee status.

=== Areas with free internal migration ===
- The European Economic Area (due to EU's Citizens’ Rights Directive)
- The Eurasian Economic Union (EAEU)
- The Economic Community of West African States (ECOWAS)
- The Treaties of Friendship between India and Bhutan and between India and Nepal
- The Trans-Tasman Travel Arrangement between New Zealand and Australia
- The Compact of Free Association between the United States and the Marshall Islands, Micronesia and Palau
- The CARICOM Single Market and Economy (CSME in the Caribbean) (with restrictions)
- Citizenship of the Mercosur (South America)
- The Common Travel Area "between the United Kingdom, the Crown Dependencies (Bailiwick of Jersey, Bailiwick of Guernsey and the Isle of Man) and Ireland"
- The Central America-4 Border Control Agreement between El Salvador, Guatemala, Honduras, and Nicaragua

=== Areas with free external migration ===
All people, regardless of citizenship are allowed to live and work in Svalbard without a visa or residence permit, as long as they demonstrate they are able to support themselves.

== See also ==
- Discrimination based on nationality
- Vienna Convention on Consular Relations
- Refugee law
