= Argentina citizenship by investment programme =

Citizenship by investment programme

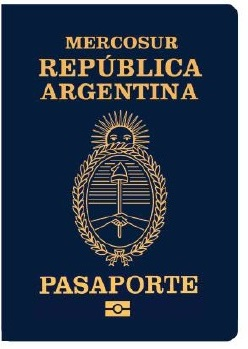
Accepted investors are eligible to apply for an Argentine passport

Since 2025, Argentina has been running a citizenship by investment programme to encourage foreign direct investment, job creation, and attract global talent to the country.

Under the Javier Milei government, a formal framework for foreign investors who make a 'relevant' investment to apply for Argentine citizenship, was established on 31 July 2025.

== Cost ==
Foreign nationals are charged either a $350,000 non-refundable contribution, or must buy a government bond subscription worth $800,000. Spouses and children (aged 18-25) of applicants are charged an additional $100,000 each, with minors costing $25,000 each.

== Due diligence process ==
Applicants must undergo strict identity verification, financial analysis, a juristictional risk assessment, and a review of criminal records and previous immigration history. These due dilligence processes are aligned with recommendations by the OECD and FATF, to ensure a rigorous evaluation process, to maintain national security.

== Background ==
The programme was started under the Javier Milei government

In April 2025, Argentina received emergency loans from the IMF and World Bank, with its national economy being considered one of the world's most fragile in the world. The country has defaulted on or restructured parts of its national debt multiple times in the 2020s. President Javier Milei intends the programme to attract wealthy investors, to "strengthen the Argentine Republic's fiscal and financial position". In 2026, the country lost 33 companies a day under his government.
