= Naming customs of Hispanic America =

The naming customs of Hispanic America are similar to the Spanish naming customs practiced in Spain, with some modifications to the surname rules. Many Hispanophones in the countries of Spanish-speaking America have two given names, a paternal surname (primer apellido or apellido paterno) and a maternal surname (segundo apellido or apellido materno).

== Colonial Hispanic America ==
In the colonial period and nineteenth century, it was common to have between one and three given names followed by a second name with a de 'from' in front. For example, consider Saint Teresa de Los Andes whose birth name is Juana Enriqueta Josefina de los Sagrados Corazones Fernández del Solar. "Juana", "Enriqueta" and "Josefina" are her first names, followed by the second name "de los Sagrados Corazones". Her paternal surname is "Fernández" and her maternal surname is "del Solar".

Another form of second name can be preceded by a de particle, which can be varied to del or de los. Examples are "José del Pilar", "Rosa del Carmen", "Fidelina de las Mercedes". These second names are only used in formal occasions, and in many cases only registered in the birth, marriage and death certificates.

== Modern day ==
Children who are not recognized by their father or to be raised separately have been legally treated in two ways, changing from time to time according to the civil registration norms. One way is to be registered with only a first surname that is the mother's surname.

=== Argentina ===
Generally speaking, Argentine family names usually consist of a single, paternal surname. However, due to the large number of people of Spanish descent, with identical surnames, many Argentines still use the surnames of both parents. In modern-day Argentina, it is not common for married women to adopt their spouse's surname after marriage, although in the past some did add the spousal surname after their own with a de 'of', as in Eva Duarte de Perón.

=== Chile ===
Until 2022, instead of primer apellido (first surname) and segundo apellido (second surname), legally, the following expressions were used: apellido paterno (paternal surname) and apellido materno (maternal surname). Today, according to the Chilean Civil Code, a person's name is composed by the given name or names and the surname or surnames (first and second). The order of the surnames in a family is decided when registering the first common child, by agreement of their parents, and every sibling must bear the same surnames. Both surnames are equally important and having two surnames is obligation for any person in birth registrations, the use of them are mandatory for any official document. Exceptionally some people may have only one surname.

In Chile people never replace their surnames by the spouse's ones at marriage. Spouse's name adoption is not socially practiced and the possibility of so doing is not even contemplated by the law. Although a woman may socially use the marital conjunction de—a very rare practice nowadays, considered to be antiquated by many or even derogative—it is omitted in her legal name. For example, former first lady Marta Larraechea very often is called Marta Larraechea de Frei, but her full legal name remains Marta Larraechea Bolívar. As another example, Soledad Alvear is almost never called Soledad Alvear de Martínez; her full legal name is María Soledad Alvear Valenzuela.

=== Colombia ===
In Colombia, the use is two surnames: first the paternal surname and then the maternal surname. Married women used to change their second last name for their husband's first last name adding the preposition de between the two last names. However, starting around the 1960s, married women do not change their original family names for their husband's. Children who are not recognized by their father are frequently registered with the two maternal surnames.

Starting in 2021, parents can reverse this order by mutual agreement. The rule will be applied according to the type of couple: in the case of heterosexual couples, the order will be as in general practice (the first last name will be the paternal last name and the second last name will be the maternal last name). Parents of the same sex may choose the order of both surnames of the children (either by birth or adoption) by mutual agreement. In case of disagreement, the order of the surnames is determined by lottery.

The law also allows the correction of some of the names, the elimination of some of the names or surnames, inverting the surnames or the change of names and surnames.

=== Costa Rica, Cuba, Dominican Republic, Honduras, Nicaragua, and Puerto Rico ===
In Costa Rica, Cuba, the Dominican Republic, Honduras, Nicaragua, and Puerto Rico, both men and women carry their two family names (first their father's, and second their mother's). Both are equally important and are mandatory for any official document. Married women typically do not change their original family names for their husband's. Even when they migrate to other countries where this is a common practice, many prefer to adhere to their heritage and keep their maiden name. They also use de.

=== Ecuador ===
In Ecuador, a couple can choose the order of their children's surnames. Most choose the traditional order (e.g., Guerrero García in the example above), but some invert the order, putting the mother's paternal surname first and the father's paternal surname last (e.g., García Guerrero from the example above). Such inversion, if chosen, must be consistent for all children of the marriage.

=== Mexico ===
Mexico follows the two-surname model used elsewhere in the Spanish speaking world. Until 2025, the order of the children's surnames was the traditional paternal-maternal one; a decision by the Supreme Court of Mexico in December 2025 ruled that parents could, "by mutual consent", freely choose the order used. The same ruling also lifted restrictions on the intergenerational transfer of compound surnames – joined by prepositions, the conjunction y, or a hyphen – thereby preserving traditional surname combinations that would otherwise be lost.

=== Uruguay ===
Uruguayans carry two surnames, as is the practice in most Spanish-speaking countries. Such custom has been recognized under Uruguayan laws No. 15.462 and 19.075.

Regarding names, it is a common practice for Uruguayans to carry two names. Under Section 5 of Law No. 15.462, it is forbidden to the Officers of Public Registrars to register "names that are extravagant, ridiculous, immoral or that may provoke a misunderstanding regarding the sex of the child on whom it is being imposed.".

Regarding surnames, according to those laws, if no agreement has been reached, the first surname shall be the father's surname (paternal surname), and the second surname shall be the mother's surname (maternal surname, or maiden surname).

Women do not change their surnames upon marriage in Uruguay. In some instances, such as high society meetings, the partner's surname can be added after the person's surnames using the preposition de 'of', but it is not a practice officially or legally provided, recognized or accepted.

Since 2013, parents may invert this order by mutual agreement, at the naming of the first child of the couple. Subsequent children must be named following the same order, since once the order of the surnames has been established it cannot be changed. If there is no agreement on the order, the rule shall apply depending on the type of couple: in case of heterosexual couples, the order shall be as in general practice (first surname shall be the paternal surname and the second surname shall be the maternal surname). Same-sex parents may choose the order of both surnames of the children (either from birth or adoption) by mutual agreement. In case of disagreement the order of the surnames is determined by draw.

For example, Natalia Marisa Oreiro Iglesias is the daughter of Carlos Florencio Oreiro Poggio and Mabel Cristina Iglesias Bourié. Note that the marriage between her parents did not mean that the mother lost her maiden surnames.

In Uruguay, foreigners may retain use of their cultural naming customs, yet upon being granted the Uruguayan national identification document called Cédula de Identidad, they are legally obliged to assume Spanish-style names (a name or two, and two surnames). If the naturalised person is from a one-surname culture (paternal surname), the maiden name of the mother needs to be obtained, and if such cannot be evidenced, the surname is then duplicated.

=== Venezuela ===
In August 2007, a draft law by the Venezuelan National Electoral Council thus sought to change the national Venezuelan naming customs:

'Civil Registry Organic Law Project: Limitation upon the inscription of names Article 106 "...[civil registrars] will not permit... [parents] to place names [upon their children] that expose them to ridicule; that are extravagant or difficult to pronounce in the official language; that contain familiar and colloquial variants that denote a confused identification, or that generate doubts about the determination of the sex. In these cases, the registrar will offer, as reference, a listing of the most common names and surnames... The names of boys, girls, or adolescents of the country's indigenous ethnic groups and the names of foreigners' children are excepted from this disposition...."

Popular complaint against the naming-custom-limiting Article 106 compelled the Venezuelan National Electoral Council to delete it from the Civil Registry Organic Law Project.

== The particle "de" (of) ==
In some instances, such as high society meetings, the husband's surname can be added after the woman's surnames using the conjunction de 'of'. Thus Leocadia Blanco Álvarez, married to a Pedro Pérez Montilla, may be addressed as Leocadia Blanco de Pérez or as Leocadia Blanco Álvarez de Pérez. This format is not used in everyday settings and has no legal value (with the exception of Bolivia and the Dominican Republic).

In other nations, doing so is frowned upon. The contemporary naming custom now practises the wife retaining her surname. The use of the husband's surname by a wife is typically encountered in social situations where the connection to the husband is being stressed. Her full formal married-name (Ángela López Sáenz de Portillo) is the documentary convention in only some Latin American countries. Where it exists, the custom provides her with ceremonial life and death wife-names, Ángela López, Sra. de Portillo (Ángela López, Wife of Portillo) wherein Sra. (señora, 'Mrs') connotes 'wife'; and Ángela López Sáenz, vda. de Portillo (Ángela López Sáenz, Widow of Portillo), wherein vda. (viuda, 'widow') denotes widowhood.

Some names have the de conjunction without association to marriage at all. Instead they may reflect the geographical origin of the individual or that of the individual ancestors. Thus there are men named Juan Ponce de León, José de Guzmán Benítez, Cristián de la Fuente and Oscar de la Renta.

In the following list, some women who have used the suffix de between their paternal surname and their marital surname.

- Eva Duarte de Perón born: María Eva Duarte
- Bertha Hernández de Ospina born: Bertha Hernández Fernández
- Carolina Isakson de Barco born: Mary Caroline Isakson
- María Clemencia de Santos born: María Clemencia Rodríguez Múnera
- Gabriela Rodríguez de Bukele born: Gabriela Roberta Rodríguez Perezalonso
- Patricia Marroquín de Morales born: Hilda Patricia Marroquín Argueta
- Fabiana Rosales de Guaido born: Fabiana Andreina Rosales Guerrero
- Ana María Romero de Campero born: Ana María Romero Pringle

== Legal implications ==
In a 2006 decision on Corona Fruits & Veggies v. Frozsun Foods, from one of the California Courts of Appeal, the court held that a creditor had failed to perfect its security interest in the strawberry crop of a debtor whose full true name was "Armando Muñoz Juárez". In accordance with Mexican naming convention, he frequently went by Armando Muñoz, and signed documents by that name, and the creditor's financing statement therefore referred to him as "Armando Muñoz". The court ruled: "Debtor's last name did not change when he crossed the border into the United States. The 'naming convention' is legally irrelevant[.]" In other words, under the California implementation of the Uniform Commercial Code, the debtor's "true last name" was Juárez (his maternal surname). Using the full name, including both the paternal and the maternal surname, would have also been legitimate.

== Indexing ==
According to The Chicago Manual of Style, Spanish and Hispanophone names are indexed by the family name. In case there are two family names, the indexing is done under the father's family name; this would be the first element of the surname. Depending upon the person involved, the particle de may be treated as a part of a family name or it may be separated from a family name. The indexing of Hispanophone names differs from that of Portuguese or Lusophone names, where the indexing occurs from the final element of the name.
