= Passports of the Mercosur =

Passport issued to the Mercosur

The Mercosur itself does not issue ordinary passports, but ordinary passport booklets issued by its 5 member states (plus associated), and share a common format. This common format features a colored cover (for which blue) emblazoned—in the official language(s) of the issuing country (and sometimes its translation into English and French)—with the title "Mercosur", followed by the name(s) of the member state, the heraldic "Arms" of the State concerned, the word "PASSPORT", together with the biometric passport symbol at the bottom center of the front cover.

== Use ==
With a valid passport, Mercosur citizens are entitled to exercise the Agreement on residency for nationals of the Mercosur Party States (meaning they do not need a Visa, a certain amount of money, or a certain reason to travel freely and no residence permit for settling) in the Mercosur and associated (Argentina, Brazil, Bolivia, Paraguay, and Uruguay). When going through border controls to enter an aforementioned country, citizens possessing valid biometric passports are sometimes able to use automated gates, such as Peru (an associated member) instead of immigration counters. As an alternative to holding a passport, Mercosur citizens can also use a valid national identity card to exercise their right of free movement within the Mercosur, Chile and associated.

== Common design features ==
While considerable progress has been made in harmonizing some features, the data page can be found at the front or at the back of an Mercosur passport booklet and there are significant design differences throughout to indicate which member state is the issuer.

Since the 2004, Mercosur member states have started to harmonize aspects of the designs of their ordinary passport booklets. Most passports issued by Mercosur member states have the common recommended layout: blue in color with the words "Mercosur" accompanied by the name of the issuing member state printed on the cover. The unique Mercosur plenty member state Brazil refused to fully comply with the Mercosur common recommended layout even though the Mercosur passport has been changed in design.

=== Overall format ===
According to “CARACTERÍSTICAS COMUNES QUE DEBERÁN TENDER LOS PASAPORTES. SUSTITUYE A LA RESOLUCIÓN DEL GMC Nº 114/94 / CARACTERÍSTICAS COMUNS A QUE DEVERÃO TENDER OS PASSAPORTES. SUBSTITUI A RESOLUÇÃO DO GMC Nº 114/94” and its annex, the passports issued by the Mercosur member states follow a standardized format intended to ensure uniformity among the Estados Partes (member countries).

The resolution establishes that Mercosur ordinary passports should conform to the norms determined by the O.A.C.I./I.C.A.O. (International Civil Aviation Organization), while allowing each member state to incorporate specific national security features or minor design adjustments.

A system of machine-readable data is to be implemented in all passports, enabling competent authorities of member states to obtain accurate information rapidly. Member states are encouraged to adopt this system promptly, even if it is not yet in widespread use.

=== Cover ===
The cover of Mercosur passports is to be of dark blue color for ordinary passports, aligning with the color standard adopted by the bloc.

It must include, in the official language of the issuing state, the legend “MERCOSUR” (or “MERCOSUL” in Portuguese) placed at the top portion of the front cover, above the name of the issuing country. Beneath the country name, the word “PASAPORTE” (or its equivalent in the national language) appears, followed by the national coat of arms or emblem, which must correspond in placement and style to similar international standards.

Since the introduction of biometric features, most Mercosur passports also include the biometric passport symbol on the cover, in line with ICAO recommendations.

=== Technical characteristics ===
Mercosur passports generally follow the ICAO ID-3 (ISO/IEC 7810) standard dimensions of 88 × 125 mm (B7 format). They contain 32 to 48 pages, depending on the issuing country, and include both printed and electronic security elements such as holograms, watermarks, microprinting, and digital chips for biometric data storage.

Each passport’s data page includes information in the official language of the issuing state and English or Spanish as a secondary language that facilitate international use.

=== Current Passports of the Mercosur ===
Member state	Passport cover	Biodata page	Cost	Validity	Issuing authority	Latest version
Argentina			AR$35,000 regular; AR$70,000 express; AR$125,000 instant	10 years (overage); 5 years (aged 0–17)	Renaper	2023
Brazil			BRL 257,25	1 year after issuance for children up to the age of 1; 2 years for children at the age of 2; 3 years for children at the age of 3; 4 years for children at the age of 4; 5 years for applicants aged 5 to 18, and 10 years for all other applicants (aged 18 and above)	Renaper	2023
Paraguay	Link to the image					2023
Uruguay			UYU$3.397 Common revenue; UYU $6.613 Urgent renewal procedure	10 years	DNIC	2015

== Multiple and simultaneous passports ==
=== Same country ===
Some Mercosur countries, such as Brazil and Malta, allow their citizens to have several passports at once to circumvent certain travel restrictions. This can be useful if wanting to travel while a passport remains at a consulate while a visa application is processed, or wanting to apply for further visas while already in a foreign country. It can also be needed to circumvent the fact that visitors whose passports show evidence of a visit to Israel are not allowed to enter Iran, Iraq, Lebanon, Libya, Saudi Arabia, Sudan, Syria and Yemen (It is, however, possible to get the Israeli entry and exit stamp on a separate piece of paper).

=== Multiple citizenship ===
Each Mercosur member state can make its own citizenship laws, so some countries allow dual or multiple citizenship without any restrictions (e.g. Argentina, Uruguay), some allow multiple citizenships but ignore existence of other citizenships within their borders (e.g. Argentina), some regulate/restrict it (e.g. Brazil), and others allow it only in exceptional cases (e.g. Paraguay).

== Emergency passports ==
Decision 38 / 2004 of the mercosur of 16/12/2004 on the establishment of an emergency travel document decided that there would be a standard DOCUMENTO DE VIAJE PROVISORIO MERCOSUR/DOCUMENTO DE VIAGEM PROVISÓRIO MERCOSUL(DVPM).

DVPM are issued to Mercorsur citizens for a single journey back to the Mercosur country of which they are a national, to their country of permanent residence or, in exceptional cases, to another destination (inside or outside the Union). The decision does not apply to expired national passports; it is specifically restricted to cases where valid and unexpired passports have been lost, stolen, destroyed, or are temporarily unavailable (i.e. left somewhere else by accident).

== See also ==
- Citizenship of the Mercosur
- National identity cards in the Organization of American States
