= Uruguayan nationality law =

Uruguayan Citizenship Act

General Assembly of Uruguay
- Long title: An Act relating to Uruguayan citizenship
- Enacted by: Government of Uruguay
- Status: Current legislation

Uruguayan nationality law is based on the principle of jus soli and a limited form of jus sanguinis. The Uruguayan Constitution does not use the word "national" in defining those inhabitants (habitantes) of Uruguay. Those inhabitants are described as "natural citizens" and "legal citizens" in Article 73 of the Constitution. According to Article 74, natural citizens are born in the territory of Uruguay and the children of natural citizens, wherever those children are born. In Article 75, the steps to become a legal citizen are set forth. In terms of the text of the Constitution, the term national is only introduced in the Constitution in Article 81. Article 81 states that, "Nationality is not lost by being naturalized in another country, to recover the exercise of the rights of citizenship, it is enough to come to the Republic (avecinarse) and register in the Civic Registry." Further, a second clause in Article 81 provides, "Legal citizenship is lost by any other form of subsequent naturalization."

Article 81 is often cited as the reason that some scholars assert that the Uruguayan Constitution assigns nationality only to natural citizens, and not legal citizens. The text found in Article 81 is a recent addition to the Constitution, having been added in the Constitution in 1934. Prior to that date, the Constitution of Uruguay used the term "citizenship" in place of the word "nationality" for the concept of the status that was lost by an Uruguayan when they naturalized in another state. In particular, the Constitution of 1918, in Article 13, provided, "Citizenship is lost ... by being naturalized in another country, and in order to recover it, it is sufficient to be domiciled in the Republic and to register in the Civic Registry." The original Constitution, that of 1830, also used only the word citizenship in place of where the word nationality occurs today. Article 12.3 of the founding document provided, "Citizenship is lost by naturalization in another country."

In light of the ambiguities in the Constitution, nationality in Uruguay at this time is regulated by a positive law that some scholars claim interprets the modified Constitution of 1967. Law 16.021, promulgated in 1989, provides that:

Article 1

Men and women born anywhere in the territory of the Republic shall be considered nationals of the Oriental Republic of Uruguay.

Article 2

The children of any of the persons mentioned in the preceding article shall likewise have said nationality, regardless of the place of their birth.

Article 3

The children of the persons to whom Article 2 of this law grants the quality of nationals, born outside the national territory, shall have the quality of natural citizens.

Article 4

Article 74 of the Constitution of the Republic shall be interpreted in the sense that it shall be understood by "avecinamiento" the performance of acts that show, in an unequivocal manner, the will of the person in that sense, such as, for example:

A. The permanence in the country for a period of more than three months.
B. The lease, the promise to acquire or the acquisition of a property to live in it.
C. The installation of a trade or industry.
D. The access to a job in the public or private activity.
E. Enrollment and attendance to a public or private study center, for a minimum period of two months.
F. Any other similar act demonstrating the aforementioned purpose.

Article 5

The justification of the points required in Article 4 above shall be made before the Electoral Court, which, once it has verified compliance with at least two of the requirements (items A, B, C, D, E or F), shall proceed without further procedure to the registration in the corresponding registry.

This positive law interpreting the Constitution, in the law above, was revised to account for so-called "grandchildren" of natural citizens in 2015. The law addressing the grandchildren of natural citizens was set forth in Law 19.362. The division of citizens of Uruguay into "natural citizens," who are nationals, and "legal citizens," who are not nationals, comes from the positive law in Law 16.021. The application of this division of citizenship into those who are nationals and those who are only citizen non-nationals is implemented by the DNIC of Uruguay in an administrative statement in 2018. The Uruguayan passport of legal citizens now indicates, in the field for nationality, that a legal citizen automatically has the nationality of the country in which they were born, regardless of whether this nationality assigned by Uruguay is juridically accurate. The DNIC Manual for Identity Documents and Passports (" Manual de Document de de Identitad y Pasaporte Electronic) relies on the interpretation of the Constitution from a legal scholar, Justino Jiménez de Aréchaga, most active in early in the middle of the prior century. The DNIC Manual provides the following guidance, defining "nationality" as an innate human characteristic and declaring that it cannot be changed or modified.

In our law, the concepts of nationality and citizenship are distinguished, the former being of a real or sociological nature and the latter of a legal nature. This differentiation makes up the traditional concept that comes from the scholar of Constitutional Law, Justino Jiménez de Aréchaga.

The latter held that nationality and citizenship are two completely different individual conditions; that nationality is a permanent state of individuals that does not undergo any alteration whatever the point of the earth they inhabit, and citizenship is, on the contrary, variable and alters with the different domiciles that men acquire in the different societies into which humanity is divided.

The source of citizenship, he added, is in the actual domicile and not in nationality.

That is why he says: "each State feels who its nationals are and declares it by its law; on the other hand, each State decides who its citizens are and disposes it by its law, since nationality corresponds to a certain sociological or psychological reality" (Jiménez de Aréchaga).

By establishing in Article 81 of our Constitution that nationality is not lost even by naturalization in another country and that citizenship is lost by any other form of subsequent naturalization, the Constitution affirms the irrevocability of nationality, considering that it is due to a natural bond derived from the birth of the person, a fact in which the will of the person does not intervene.

The consequences of the same fact - naturalization in another country - on nationality and legal citizenship are different: the former is not lost, the latter is.

Consequently, the Uruguayan passport reflects this requirement, so that the place assigned to the nationality of its holder indicates the geographical place of birth.

Uruguay is the only nation on earth to deny immigrants any path to naturalization whatsoever. This local and unusual conception, as applied to the passports of Uruguayan legal citizens, creates international confusion and makes travelling across borders for those citizens unreliable or sometimes impossible.

== Disputes over the Constitutional interpretation of national and proposed solutions ==
The interpretation of the Constitution of Uruguay that leads to this belief that the language of the Constitution divides citizens into "nationals" and "non-national citizens" comes from the work of one of the most well regarded Uruguayan legal scholars, Justino Jiménez de Aréchaga. In his words: "First, nationality appears to us as a natural bond, derived from birth, from blood." He believed that "nationality corresponds to a certain reality of a sociological or psychological type." Speaking for the drafters of the 1830 constitution, Jiménez de Aréchaga concludes, "The quality of nationality depends, therefore, on one fact: birth within the territory of the State." Because of this, "nationality is irrevocable." This interpretation is found in a volume of one of the fundamental academic interpretative texts used in Uruguay.

Other well regarded legal scholars argue that the text of the Constitution does not demand this denial of nationality to the legal citizens of Uruguay. Another issue under discussion is whether Uruguay may be non-compliant in its application of international treaty conventions on statelessness and the application of those conventions under Article 72 of the Uruguayan Constitution as principles of constitutional law. This issue of the practical impact of having two categories of Uruguayan citizens, one national and one not, has led to the introduction of two proposed laws. The first proposed law is called the law of "Consolidación de la Libertad de Circulación de los Ciudadanos Legales Uruguayos", or "Consolidation of the Freedom of Movement of Legal Uruguayan Citizens." It would address certain administrative problems, such as the incongruity of the Uruguayan passport with international standards, but not address the interpretation of the Constitution that is identified above in the words of Jiménez de Aréchaga. The second or alternative law is called "Derecho a la Ciudadanía en Igualdad", or, in English, "Right to Equal Citizenship." citizen groups are working with parliamentarians and scholars to address the issue of proper constitutional interpretation.

The association Somos Todos Uruguayos requested a thematic hearing before the Inter-American Commission on Human Rights on 3 December 2023. That request was granted, a rare occurrence, demonstrating the Inter-American Commission on Human Rights' dedication to ending statelessness and addressing arbitrary revocation and denial of nationality. The hearing is scheduled to take place on 1 March 2024 in Washington, D.C. A full set of the submitted documents, annexes, and an overview of the legal issues is available.

== See also ==
- Visa policy of Uruguay
- Visa requirements for Uruguayan citizens
- Uruguayan passport
