= Argentine passport =

Passport issued to Argentine citizens

Argentine passport; Pasaporte argentino
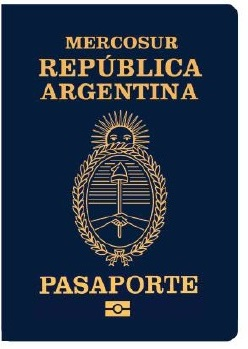
- The front cover of a contemporary Argentine biometric passport (with chip) from February 2026
- Type: Passport
- Issued by: Passport authorities designated by the Argentine Provinces (Registro Civiles, alongside RENAPER (in Argentina); Argentine embassies or consulates (Aboard)
- First issued: 1810s, 19th century (First passport) See "History" 1996-2008 First Machine-readable passports 2009 (Modern passports) 2012 (First biometric version); 2018 (smart case); 2023 (accent on "República" in the cover) 2026 (New series and design)
- Purpose: ID
- Eligibility: Argentine citizenship or special cases
- Expiration: 5 years after issuance (people aged 0-17) or 10 years after issuance (people 18 or older) 2 years (exceptional passport for foreigners)
- Cost: AR$100,000 regular; AR$200,000 express; AR$330,000 instant

An Argentine passport (Spanish: Pasaporte argentino, pronounced [pˌasapˈoɾte ˌaɾxentˈino]) is an identity document issued to nationals of Argentina for the purpose of international travel. An Argentine passport is, besides the Argentine ID card and the Argentine Emergency Travel Document (called "Pasaporte de Emergencia de Lectura Mecánica"), the only other officially recognised document that Argentine authorities will routinely accept as proof of identity from Argentine citizens.

Besides serving as proof of identity and presumption of Argentine nationality, they facilitate the process of securing assistance from Argentine consular officials abroad (or other Mercosur members in the case that an Argentine consular facility is absent). Argentine passports are valid for ten years (for people aged 18 and older) or five years (for people under the age of 18) and share the standardised layout and navy blue design with other Mercosur passports. Every Argentine citizen is also a citizen of the Mercosur. The passport, along with the national identity card, allows for free rights of movement and residence in any of the states of the Mercosur, Andean Community and Chile (with the exception of Guayana and Suriname).

As of 2026, the passport is issued in a revised design introduced under Disposición 54/2026, a revised version of the Argentine passport was introduced, with updated design and security features. The new version entered into force on 1 February 2026 and includes a polycarbonate data page and 34 pages. This also affected the Argentine identity card.

== History ==
The first Argentine pasaport comes from the Policía Federal Argentina (PFA). Following the federalization of Buenos Aires in 1880, the city became notable in national aspects of government.
The Policía Federal was formally established by statute in 1944, entering into operation under its new statute on 1 January 1945. The statute expressly authorized the Policía Federal to issue passports. The Policía Federal's authority to issue passports was subsequently incorporated into its Organic Law of 1958, which listed the issuance of passports among on its statutory powers. In 1966, Decree 2015 established a detailed Reglamento de Documentos de Identidad y de Viaje. It provided that, except for diplomatic and official passports, Argentine passports were granted by the Policía Federal throughout the national territory. The regulations also established a National Passport Registry maintained by the Policía Federal. In 2011, the responsibility for issuing ordinary passports was transferred to the Dirección Nacional del Registro Nacional de las Personas (RENAPER). Decree 261/2011 approved a new passport-issuance regulation, repealed the 1966 Policía Federal regulation, and provided that passports previously issued by the Policía Federal would remain valid until their expiration. Nowadays, RENAPER remains responsible for the issuance of ordinary Argentine passports under the current regulatory framework.

== Issuance ==
In accordance with Presidential Decree 2015–66, in order to get an Argentine passport, a person must go to the nearest civil registry office and present his/her national identity document, birth certificate and a proof of marital status (unless single). If the person is an Argentine citizen by naturalisation rather than by birth, a citizenship certificate (carta de ciudadanía) must also be presented. Citizens under the age of 18 may get a passport only with parental authorization. Argentines living outside the country must follow the same procedure at an Argentine embassy or consulate.

It can be ordinary or provisional, or in special cases, diplomatic or service-related.

Since January 2011, Argentine passport are valid for 10 years. Beforehand, they were valid only for 5-year periods.

Argentine citizens are generally entitled to a regular passport for Argentines, except in circumstances including an outstanding judicial arrest/capture order or being declared in absentia in a criminal proceeding, certain judicially imposed restrictions on freedom of movement, or a judicial prohibition on passport issuance or leaving the country.

== Time of processing ==
Processing time for an Argentine "Regular" passport is usually 15 days, but one can be issued in 96 hours by using the Express service if paying ARS 150.000. Or from 2 to 6 hours, if ARS 250.000.

== Physical appearance ==
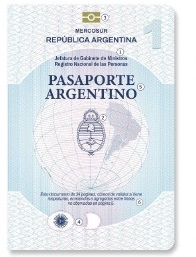
Passport card cover page of the Argentine passport in the version issued since February 2026.

Argentine passports have, since 2004, followed the standard Mercosur passport design, with navy blue cover and the Phrygian cap emblazoned in the centre of the front cover. On 12 June 2012, Argentina unveiled a new passport design to be issued from that year. The changes included a new bicontinental map on the back cover according to the disposición 3656/2018. The new passport contains new security features and graphics. For example, a large depiction of the worldmap and the map of the country is visible under UV light.

As of 2021, under the Disposición 904 / 2021, the specifications of the passport were updated and consolidated, under the RENAPER system, with slight changes.TEXTO ACTUALIZADO - Disposición 904/2021 - DIRECCION NACIONAL DEL REGISTRO NACIONAL DE LAS PERSONAS

The words MERCOSUR and REPÚBLICA ARGENTINA (Spanish for "Argentine Republic") are inscribed above the coat of arms. The words Pasaporte (Spanish for "Passport") appear below.

Argentine passports are normally 34 pages long; They cannot be extended.

=== Identity Information Page ===
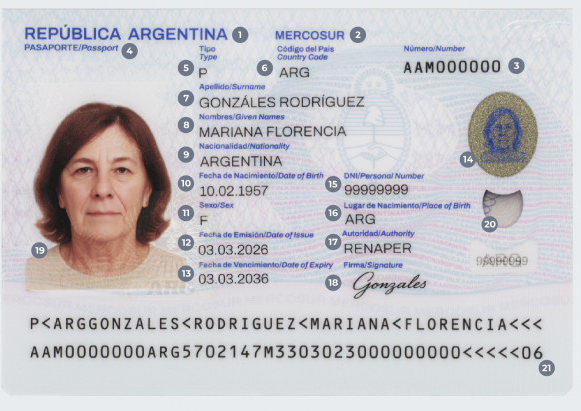
Passport card data page of the Argentine passport in the version issued since 1 February 2026.

The first two pages of an Argentine passport are security laminated and the second page includes the following data: It has a data page with a machine-readable zone and a digital photograph of the passport

- Photo of passport owner
- Type of document (P = passport)
- Code for issuing country (ARG = Argentina)holder.
- Surname
- Name at birth
- Given names
- Date of birth
- Sex
- Nationality Argentina (In the Exceptional Passport for Foreigners any other)
- Place of birth
- Date of issue
- Date of expiry
- Authority that issued the passport
- DNI number (known officially in English as “personal number”)
- Owner's signature (_______) (Note: If the holder is unable to sign, the field may display “NO FIRMA”.)

The previous version also included:

- Passport copy (i.e., the number of passports the bearer had before the current one)
- Marital status
- Police-registry Number

The passport includes a map depicting Argentina and the territories that Argentina claims in the South Atlantic and Antarctica.

The page ends with a 2-line machine readable zone, according to ICAO standard 9303. The country code is not ARG as is the standard country code for Argentina (according to ISO 3166-1 alpha-3), but A. This is the only country/citizen code which does not consist of 3 letters. The MRZ also includes a version number (YYMM).

As of Resolución RENAPER Nº 542/2014, the first security laminate was included on the passport, who has expessed, cited impovements of it "by virtue of improvements adopted in passport lamination techniques".

Between 2017 and 2019, the so-called security laminefeature was added – a number of holographic security elements, including a bright, prominent hologram in the upper right corner (the so-called Holographic Shadow Picture), a holographic copy of the machine-readable zone, holographic microprinting, and kinematic elements.

In 2019, due to the Dispocición 2930/2019, a newer leaf on Passports were added. This didn't apply to diplomatic and official passports.

As of February 2026, according to provision 54/2026, the revised version of the passport began to be issued, adapting to the most recent measures of the ICAO standard. This version features a redesign of the photo page, which is now printed on polycarbonate, and 34 pages instead of the previous 32. In addition, the address field is added, which was not present in previous issuances. The newer model of Argentine passports are made by RENAPER (National Registry of People), but with a tender with Ipesa SA, that at the same time belogs to Eduardo Lerner (linked or associated with Chinese firm Emperor), in order to adapt to the newer security features and standards.

=== Following page ===
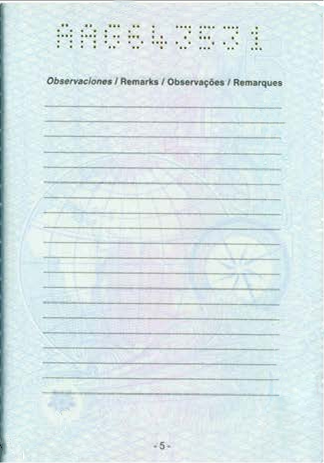
Inside page 5 of the Argentine passport in the version since from 2024.

The following page (page 5) have a remarks page, this parts can be used for instance if:

- They were children of native Argentine citizens who, having been born abroad, opted for citizenship of origin (Article 1, Inciso 2, Law No. 346 and its amendments).
- They were born in the legations or on warships of the Argentine Republic (Article 1, Inciso 3, Law No. 346 and its amendments).
- They were born in neutral seas, under the Argentine flag (Article 1, Inciso 5, Law No. 346 and its amendments).

=== Languages ===
The data page/information page is printed in Spanish, English. There are also parts described in French and Portuguese (see below).

=== Required documents to apply for a passport in Argentina ===
Individuals applying for an adult passport in Argentina need to adhere to specific document requirements. The following outlines the necessary documents for those aged 18 and above:

- Valid DNI Card: A current, valid DNI (Documento Nacional de Identidad) card is required.
- Previous Passport (Recommended but Not Mandatory):
  - While it is recommended, presenting a previous passport is not obligatory.
    - For Individuals with restricted capacity:
- Judicial Testimony of Guardianship or Authorization:
  - In the case of people with restricted capacity, a judicial testimony designating the guardian(s) or authorization must be provided.
  - If no designated guardian is available, the accompanying person(s) should present the corresponding judicial authorization.
- DNI of Guardian(s) or Authorized Person:
  - The DNI of the person(s) designated as guardians or authorized judicially must be presented.
- Express Consent from Legal Guardian:
- The explicit consent of the legal guardian, indicating that their authority is not restricted, is required. If restricted, judicial authorization is necessary.

=== RFID chip with biometric certificate ===
Evolution of older Argentine passport 2012 series.

Since 1 November 2012, Argentine passports have had a contactless smartcard (proximity card) chip and 13.56 MHz loop antenna embedded into the front cover page, in accordance with ICAO standards. The chip and antenna are not easily visually recognisable, but their presence is indicated using the ICAO biometric passport symbol at the bottom of the front cover. It carries all the data printed in the passport, including a JPEG file of the photo, protected by a digital signature.

In addition the passport has the following historical milestones:

- Previously the ten fingerprints were taken physically with ink, but later were digitally by the ReNaper.
- The previously nine-digit, all-numeric, sequentially assigned serial number was replaced with a new alphanumeric pseudorandomly assigned higher-entropy serial number, to increase the entropy of the serial number from the previous 35 digits to 45 bits. This improves the cryptographic key strength of the Basic Access Control mechanism of the RFID chip by 10 bits, which makes a brute force attack approximately 1000 times more expensive.
- The Argentine passport initially has had a validity of five years for all ages. Then by 2 May 2011 the validity of the passport was ten years for adults, five years for minors. Later it was changed for 10 years for everyone and then it was reverted to the previous.
- Previously, any citizen from any country could get the "Regular passport" for "Argentines". But in 2019 due to the new guidelines it is now required to be a naturalized citizen.
  However it is important to know that the "Exceptional passport for foreigners" has the same the design as for the "Regular passport for Argentines".

=== Different spellings of the same name within the same document ===
- Names of Cyrillic origin (such as Russian): In Argentine passport, names which originally appeared in non-Latin scripts are transliterated in keeping with international standards such as ISO 9, to give a standard and accurate representation in the Latin alphabet. For example:
  - Ж → Ž
  - Ч → Č
  - Ш → Š
  - Щ → Šč
  - Ю → Û
  - Я → Â

For example, the Russian surname Горбачёв is transcribed

"Gorbatschow" in German,
"Gorbachev" in English (also ICAO standard),
"Gorbatchov" in French,
"Gorbachov" in Spanish,
"Gorbaczow" in Polish, and so on.

This causes Russian surnames and given names appear uniformly on the DNI, allowing identification and avoiding confusions between writing systems. Although there are no strict standards by law, these regulations are traditionally adhered to in practice for Argentine identification cards.

- Use of diacritics: The Argentine passport has historically often been issued without diacritics such as acute accents (tildes) in personal names. However, if the omission can be verified against the official birth certificate —the primary source for identity data— a rectification may be requested. Such corrections are considered an issuance error and can be processed without cost if claimed within 90 days of delivery of the document.

== Issuing process ==
Argentine passport are issued, just like Argentine DNIs, by Renaper Documentation Centers or in the Civil Registries. Applicants have to apply for a new passport in person and the data in newly issued passports is essentially an authenticated copy of the personal data found in locally stored registration documents. Argentine passport can be processed in Shopping centers.

== Emergency and provisional passports ==
The Argentine emergency passport is a travel document that is issued by Argentina's consular representatives overseas. Its issuance is restricted to extraordinary circumstances where the applicant can provide proof of an emergency requiring immediate travel, along with the necessary supporting documentation.

This passport has a one-year maximum validity and can be requested by Argentine citizens by birth, naturalization, or choice. Its issuance does not take the place of processing the electronic passport, which needs to be applied for concurrently. In situations where an ordinary passport cannot be issued within the normal timeframes, the document allows Argentine citizens to continue their travels or return to the country. Its use is governed by the relevant international laws, and its acceptance is contingent upon the immigration authorities of the transit and destination nations.

=== Provisional passport ===
The Argentine provisional passport (also called the salvoconducto) is a short-term travel document that is only granted by Argentine consular officials in situations of properly justified emergency or urgency. The provisional passport can only be used to allow Argentine citizens to return to Argentina. Beyond this use, it cannot be applied to other types of international travel.

== Passport message ==
Argentine passport message page.

Passports of many countries contain a message addressed to authorities of other countries identifying the bearer as a citizen of the issuing country, requesting that he or she be allowed to enter and pass through the other country, and requesting that, when necessary, he or she be given assistance consistent with international norms. In Argentine passport, the message is in Spanish, English, Portuguese and French. The message is:

In Spanish:

En nombre del Gobierno de la República Argentina, la autoridad que expide el presente pasaporte ruega y solicita a todos aquellos a quienes puede concernir, dejen pasar libremente a su titular y prestarle la asistencia y protección necesaria.

In English:

The Government of the República Argentina hereby requests all whom it may concern, to permit the bearer to pass without delay or hindrance and in case of need, to give all lawful aid and protection.

In Portuguese:

Em nome do Governo da República Argentina, a autoridade que concede o presente passaporte roga e solicita às autoridades competentes, deixar passar livremente o titular e prestar-lhe toda a assistência e proteção necessária.

In French:

Au nom du Gouvernement de la République Argentine, l'autorité qui délivre le présent passeport demande à tous ceux qui pourraient être concernés, de laisser passer librement son titulaire et lui prêter l'assistance et la protection nécessaire.

== Recommendation page ==
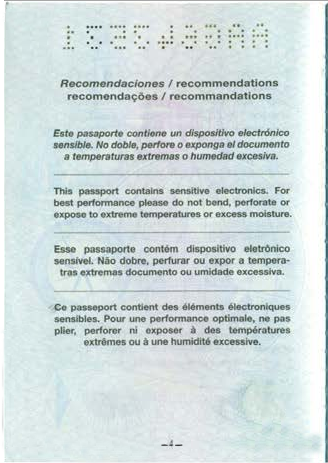
Argentine passport recommendation page.

The Argentine passport contains a recommendation note advising travelers on how to handle the document, as it includes sensitive electronic components. The recommendation is written in Spanish, English, Portuguese, and French. The text reads:

In Spanish:

Este pasaporte contiene un dispositivo electrónico sensible. No doble, perfore o exponga el documento a temperaturas extremas o humedad excesiva.

In English:

This passport contains sensitive electronics. For best performance please do not bend, perforate or expose to extreme temperatures or excess moisture.

In Portuguese:

Esse passaporte contém dispositivo eletrônico sensível. Não dobre, perfure ou exponha a temperaturas extremas documento ou umidade excessiva.

In French:

Ce passeport contient des éléments électroniques sensibles. Pour une performance optimale, ne pas plier, perforer ni exposer à des températures extrêmes ou à une humidité excessive.

== Photography ==
The process of capturing images for the Ordinary Passport for Argentines, the Travel Document for Stateless or Refugee individuals, as well as the Exceptional Passport for Foreigners, is regulated by Argentine legislation, specifically in articles 30 and 31.

=== Requirements according to Article 30 ===
According to Article 30, the photographic image to be included in the mentioned documents must meet certain standards. The photograph must be recent, taken from the front and in mid-bust, with the head completely uncovered. The image must be in color, with a white and smooth background of dimensions 4 cm x 4 cm. This format allows a faithful visualization of the facial features of the holder when processing the issuance of the document. It is essential that the image lacks alterations or falsifications of facial characteristics, respecting the right to identity in its aspects of gender, culture, or religion.

Additionally, it is specified that the eyes must be open, and no hands of third parties holding the photograph can be observed.

=== Exceptions according to Article 31 ===
Article 31 establishes exceptions to Article 30, allowing for adjustments to the photograph under certain circumstances. For religious or health treatment reasons, hair coverage may be required, as long as the main facial features are visible. Also, in cases where, for religious reasons, the face is partially or totally covered, the holder may request that the procedure and photography be carried out in a reserved place and by agents of the same gender, maintaining the characteristics mentioned in Article 30.

== Holding a second passport ==
The issuance and possession of passports in the Argentine Republic are governed by Article 9 of the relevant law. According to this article, each individual has the right to possess only one Ordinary Passport for Argentines, Travel Document for Stateless or Refugees, or Exceptional Passport for Foreigners. The exception is for individuals holding a diplomatic, official, or special passport granted by the MINISTRY OF FOREIGN AFFAIRS AND WORSHIP.

For international travel, Argentine citizens must compulsorily possess the Ordinary Passport for Argentines, unless exceptions established in International Agreements or specific regulations apply. Stateless individuals or refugees must carry the corresponding Travel Document, while foreigners residing in the ARGENTINE REPUBLIC who can prove humanitarian or force majeure reasons must carry the Exceptional Passport for Foreigners.

=== Dual Citizenship ===
Dual citizenship refers to the legal status of an individual being recognized as a citizen of two or more countries simultaneously. In the case of Argentina, it is possible for individuals to hold Argentine citizenship alongside citizenship of other nations.

There are two distinct scenarios concerning dual citizenship: countries with bilateral agreements regarding recognition of citizenship and those without such agreements.

==== Bilateral Agreements on Dual Nationality with Argentina ====
Under bilateral agreements on dual nationality with Argentina, citizens who have acquired nationality in another country may possess travel documents from that acquired nationality. These agreements are in place with various countries including Chile, Colombia, Ecuador, El Salvador, Spain, the United States (up to October 20, 1981), Honduras, Italy, Nicaragua, Norway, Panama, and Sweden.

Argentine citizens residing outside the country fall under this category. Those who have naturalized in countries with which Argentina has signed agreements on dual nationality and hold travel documents from the acquired nationality are subject to the following regulations:

- Upon entry:
  - They are initially considered foreigners and their admission to the country is assessed based on the rules applicable to their acquired nationality.
  - If they express an intention to permanently reside in Argentina, they are automatically recognized as Argentine citizens. In such cases, appropriate documentation will be stamped with the notation "ARGENTINE UPON REQUEST OF THE INTERESTED PARTY."
- Upon exit:
  - Naturalized Argentines from the aforementioned countries exit Argentina as foreigners and must carry and present the required documentation for foreign nationals.
  - Those expressing an intention to permanently reside in Argentina upon entry must present Argentine travel documents upon exit from Argentine territory.
- Requests for immigration regularization within Argentine territory:
  - Requests such as exit permits, stay extensions, work authorizations, and other immigration regularization requests are processed and granted as they would be for any other foreign national.
  - Requests for "Temporary Residence" permits are limited to a maximum duration of two (2) years, with requests for "Permanent Residence" not considered. In such cases, individuals are informed that relocating their domicile to Argentina with the intention of permanent residence automatically entails the reassumption of Argentine citizenship.
- Admission requests to Argentina from abroad:
  - Admission requests for "Transitory Residents" requiring Argentine visas due to their immigration status or acquired nationality are granted upon meeting relevant regulatory requirements.
  - Admission requests for "Temporary Residents" are granted with a maximum stay of two (2) years, subject to compliance with regulatory requirements.
  - Admission requests for "Permanent Residents" are not considered. Applicants are notified that relocating their domicile to Argentina with the intention of permanent residence automatically entails the reassumption of Argentine citizenship.

==== Countries without Bilateral Agreements on Dual Nationality ====
For Argentine citizens who have naturalized in countries with which Argentina has not signed agreements on dual nationality, they are considered Argentine citizens for all intents and purposes.

- Upon entry:
  - If they present only valid travel documents from the acquired nationality, their documents will be stamped with the notation "ARGENTINE - 180 DAYS" upon entry.
  - If their Argentine citizenship is not indicated on foreign documentation and they claim Argentine citizenship, they must provide Argentine identification.
- Upon exit:
  - To exit Argentina, they must possess valid Argentine travel documents, unless their stay in the country has not exceeded one hundred and eighty (180) consecutive days, in which case they may exit with travel documents from their acquired nationality.
- Reentry:
  - When reentering Argentina, they must present valid Argentine travel documents.
  - If they present only valid travel documents from the acquired nationality indicating their Argentine citizenship, their documents may be stamped with the notation "ARGENTINE" without specifying any duration.
  - If their Argentine citizenship is not indicated on foreign documentation and they claim Argentine citizenship, they must provide Argentine identification for recognition as such, unless their travel document was stamped with the notation "ARGENTINE" upon exit.

== Visa requirements map ==
Visa requirements for Argentine citizens holding ordinary passports Argentina Freedom of movement ID card valid Visa not required / ETA (Note: ETA required for Kenya, Saint Kitts and Nevis, New Zealand, South Korea, and Israel.) Visa on arrival eVisa Visa on arrival Visa required prior to arrival

Visa requirements for Argentine citizens are administrative entry restrictions by the authorities of other states placed on citizens of Argentina. As of 2025, Argentine citizens have visa-free or visa on arrival access to 168 countries and territories. Ranking the Argentine passport 15th in terms of travel freedom (tied with the passports of San Marino), and tied with the second greatest access of all Mercosur single market member states, according to the Henley Passport Index.

Argentine citizens can live and work in any country within the Mercosur as a result of the right of free movement and residence granted in Article 1 of the Acuerdo sobre Residencia para Nacionales de los Estados Parte del Mercosur, Bolivia y Chile (2002).

== Other types of passport ==
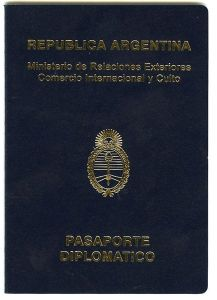
Argentine diplomatic passport

The Argentine Ministry of Foreign Affairs also issues diplomatic passports (blue-covered) to Argentine diplomats accredited overseas and their eligible dependents, and to citizens who reside in Argentina and travel abroad for diplomatic work. The ministry also issues official passports (blue-covered) to government employees assigned overseas, either permanently or temporarily, and their eligible dependents, and to members of Congress who travel abroad on official affairs.

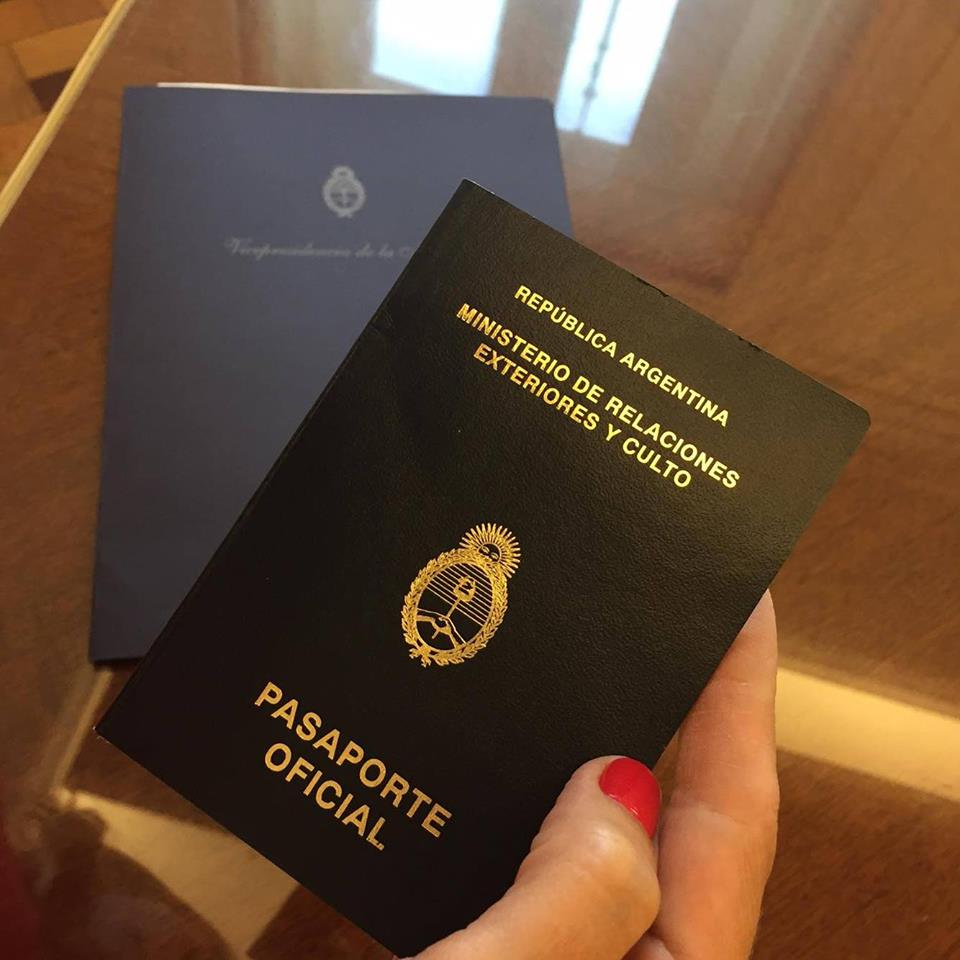
Argentine Official Passport

Under special circumstances, if a woman is stateless but married to an Argentine citizen, the federal police will issue a Pasaporte de Esposa de Argentino (Argentine wife's passport) in order to leave the country. The same applies for persons under the age of 18 who were adopted by Argentine parents.

Additionally, an "Exceptional passport for foreigners" can be issued in Argentina to non-citizens who cannot obtain their national passport. This exceptional passport is identical to those issued to Argentine nationals, without any discernible differences in its appearance or features. This unique provision ensures that foreign residents in Argentina who face difficulties in obtaining their home country's passport have a valid travel document that is on par with the regular Argentine passport. Also, foreign spouses (or widows/widowers) of Argentine citizens may, on an exceptional basis, apply for a passport at Argentine consulates only if the legislation of their country of origin has stripped them of their nationality or prevents them from obtaining a passport of their own.

== Gallery of Argentine passports ==
Old Passport of the Policía de la Ciudad de Capital Federal, issued to Victoria Ocampo

Passport card data page of Victoria Ocampo–It can be seen that the pulgar/finger was present since the begging

Passport card data page of Machine-readable zone Argentine passport

Argentine machine readable-zone passport data page with the information of photo and fingerprints–previosly presentented in data page, which later returned in modern editions (2009).

Passport card data page of machine-readable zone of 2009 model/series of Argentine passport

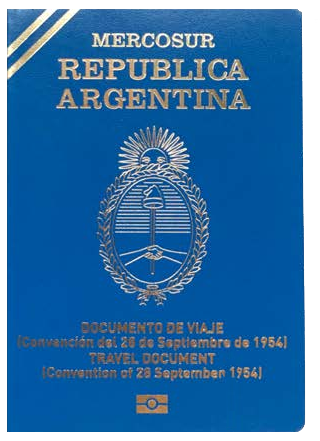
Argentine travel document for Stateless people (this is separate to the "Exceptional passport", which is the same for citizens)

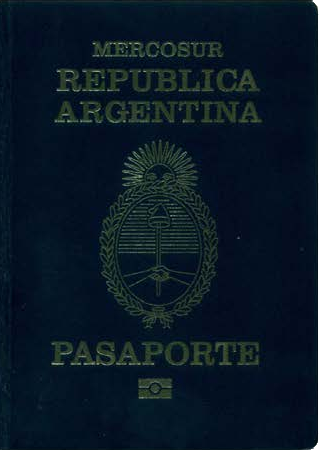
Front cover of a machine-readable, biometric Argentine Mercosur passport issued from 2012 until 2022

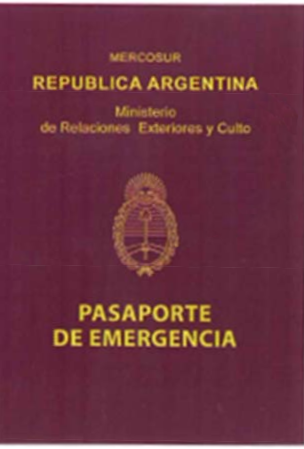
Front cover of an Argentine emergency passport issued since 2023.

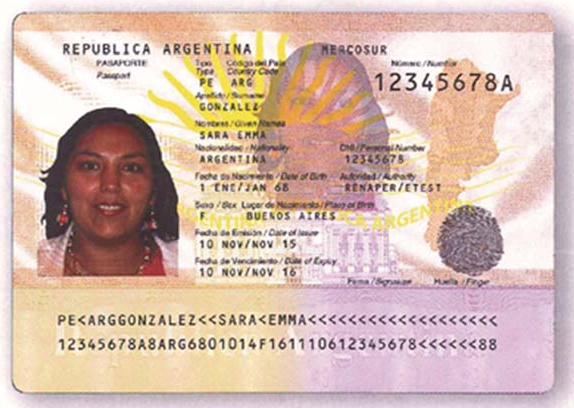
Passport card cover page of an Argentine emergency passport

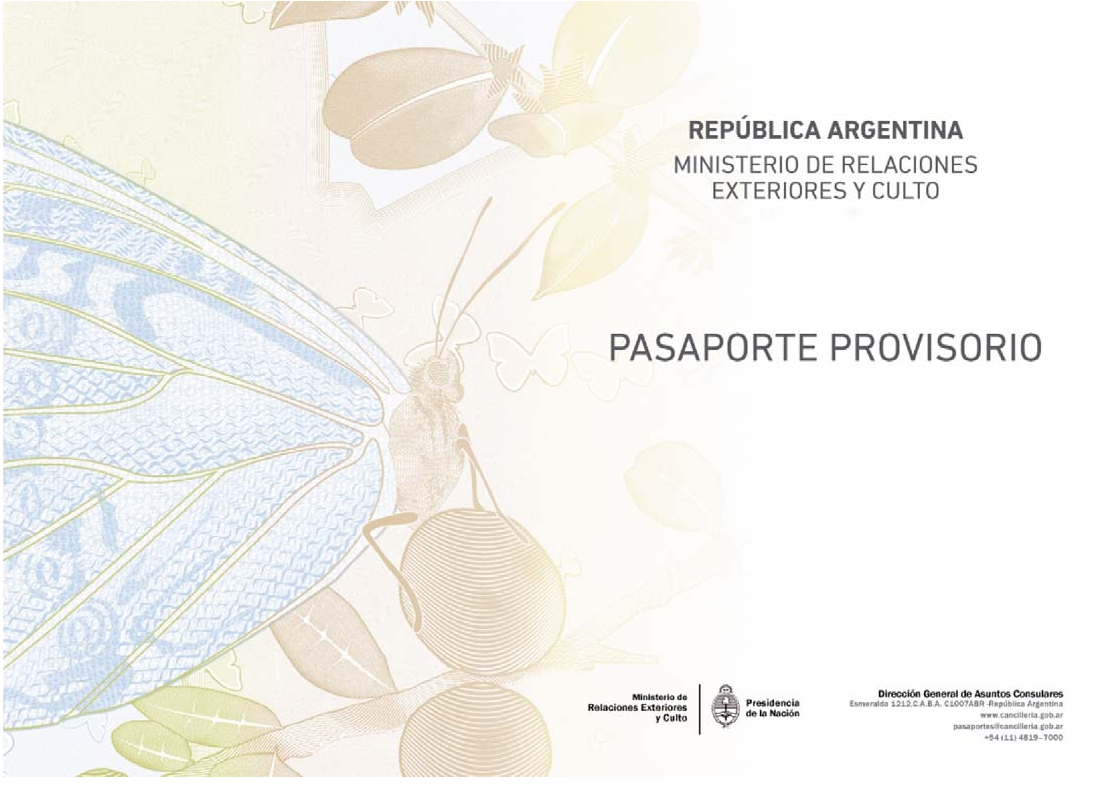
Front cover of an Argentine provisional passport issued since 2023.

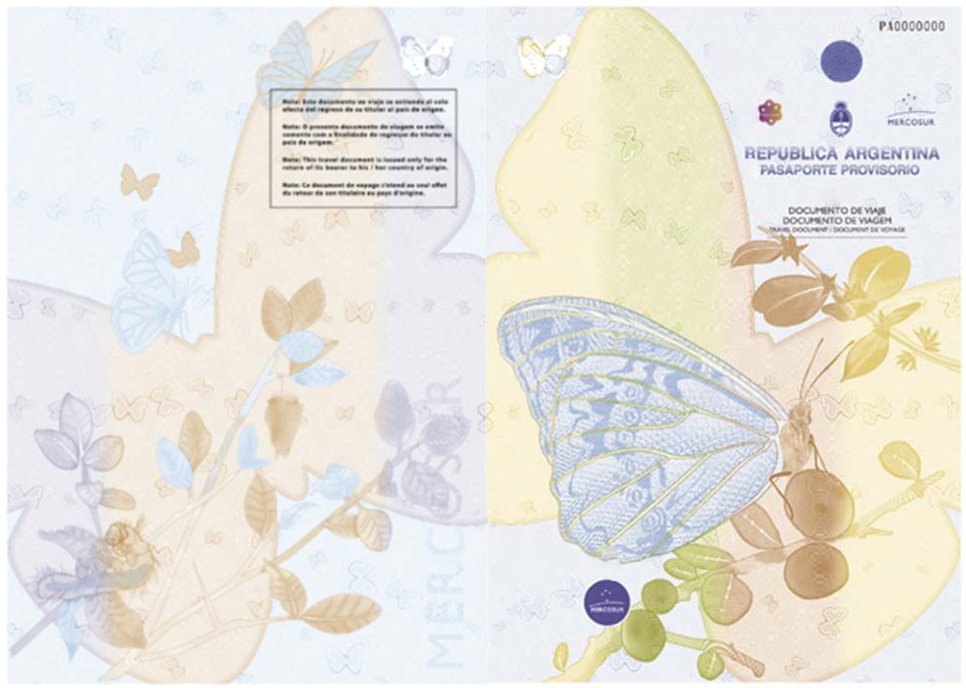
Second face of Argentine provisional passport issued since 2023.

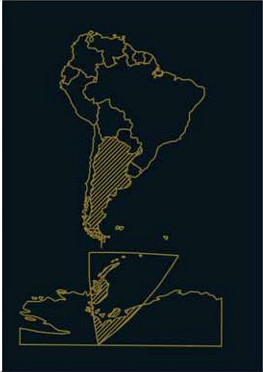
Back cover of the current version of the Argentine passport

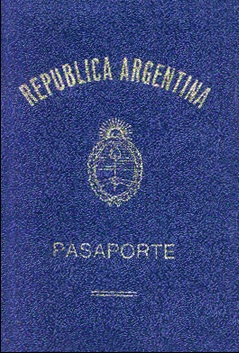
Old Argentine passport

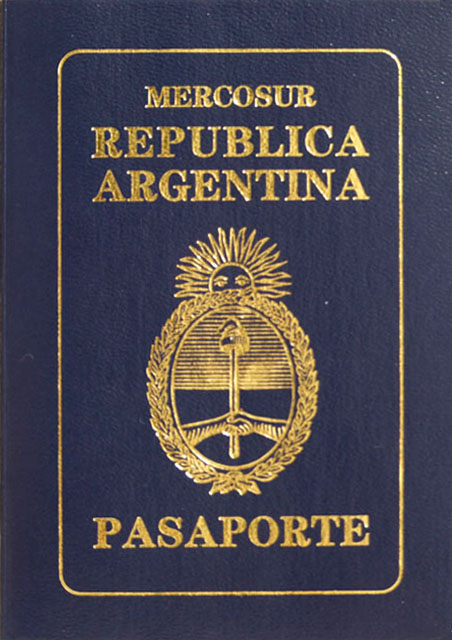
Front cover of a machine-readable, non-biometric Argentine passport issued until 2012

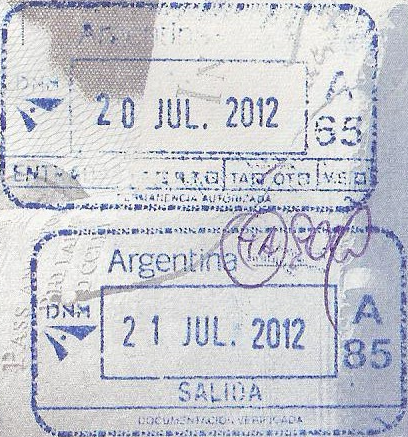
Argentine passport stamps (no longer issued)

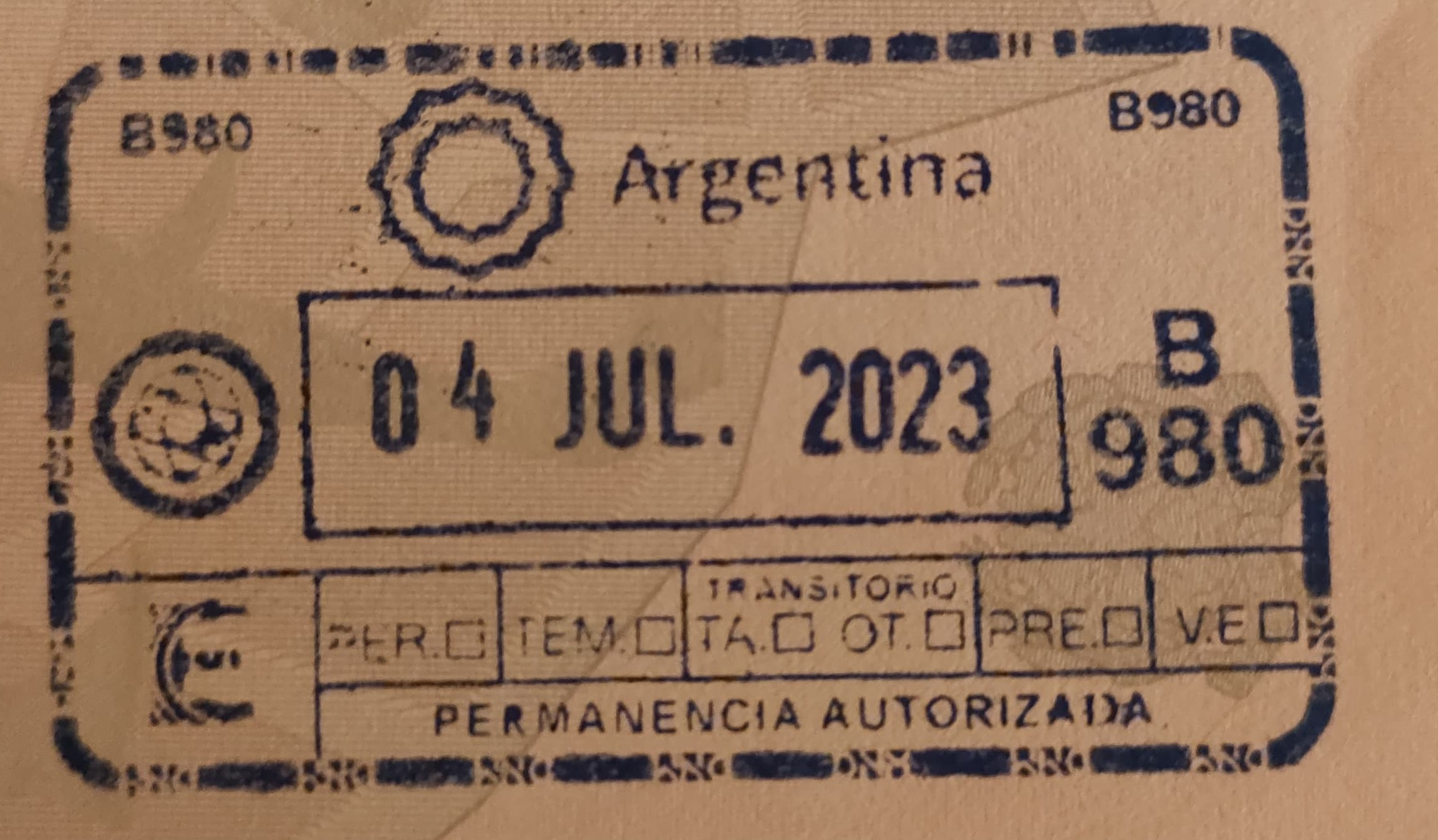
Newer Argentine passport stamps, prior to the new digital Entry-Exit system.

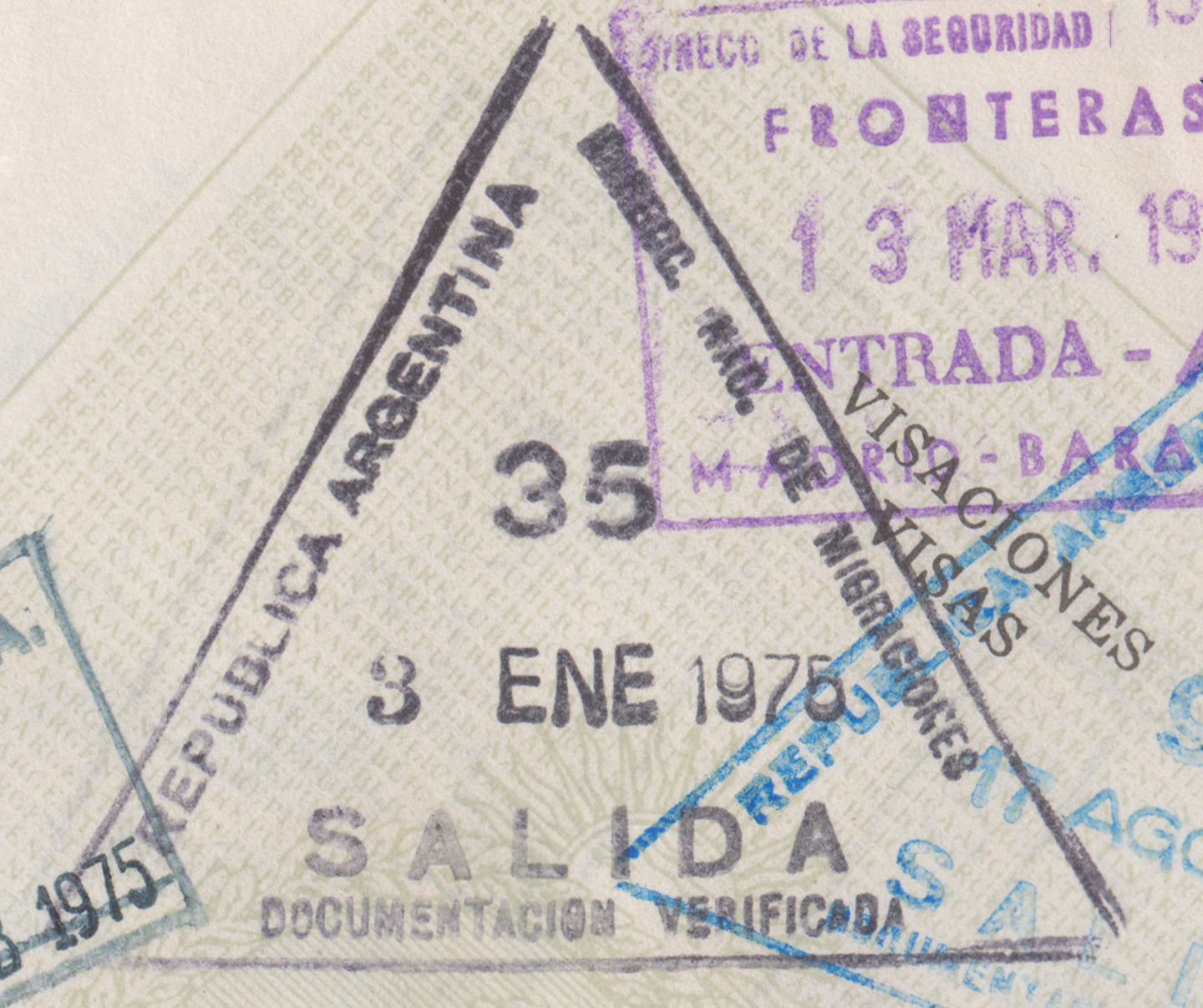
Old country exit stamp from 1975.

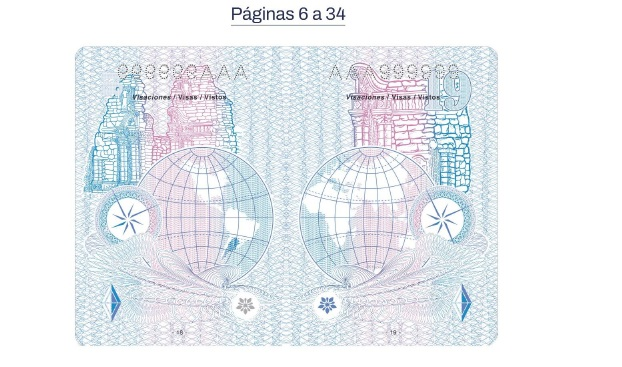
Visas page of 2026 series of Argentine passport

First revision of Argentine electronic passport (ePassport) issued to María Victoria Villareal in 2012.

== See also ==
- Visa requirements for Argentine citizens
- Visa policy of Argentina
- Argentine identity card
- Passports of the Mercosur
