= Identity Document (Uruguay) =

Travel document

Documento de idenitdad
- Type: Mandatory identity card
- Valid in: South America (except Venezuela, Guyana, Suriname and dependencies)
- Eligibility: Uruguayan citizenship or non-citizen resident
- Expiration: 5 years (underage); 10 years (overage); Never expires (over 68 years)

The Identification Document (Spanish: Documento de Identidad), also known as Cédula de identidad, (Note: The old term "Cédula de Identidad" is still widely in use unofficially (and incorrectly).) is the compulsory Uruguayan identity document, issued by the Ministry of the Interior through the National Directorate of Civil Identification (DNIC).

It is compulsory for all residents of Uruguay, whether they are natural or legal citizens, or foreign residents, even for children from 45 days old. It has a personal, unique and exclusive identification number or número de cédula –made up of eight digits–, that is assigned to the holder the first time he/she obtains the document and that keeps throughout his/her life as a general identifier. It is not usable for voting, since the Credencial Cívica serves as an identity document for those eligible on the electoral roll.

Uruguay's identity cards can be used as travel documents to enter the Mercosur members (Argentina, Bolivia, Brazil, Paraguay) and associated countries (Peru, Chile, Colombia, Ecuador; except Guyana, Suriname and Panama).

== Characteristics ==
=== Old Cédula de Identidad ===
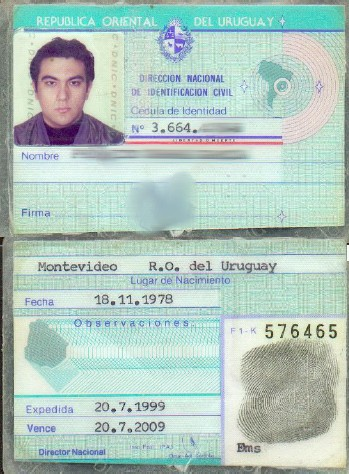
Old Cédula de Identidad in 1999

Before 2015, it was known as the "Cédula de identidad" It was a laminated card measuring approximately 9 cm in width by 5 cm in height, predominantly in light green color, displaying in its center the flag of the Thirty-Three Orientals with the inscription "Libertad o muerte" On the reverse side, it featured the owner's photo, the number assigned by the D.N.I.C. (which included a self-generated or verification digit), full name along with surnames, and the signature of the respective individual (or a note indicating the inability to sign).

The back of the card included information such as nationality, date of birth, date of document issuance, and its expiration date (usually 10 years after the date of issuance, though if issued after the age of 70, it was valid for life, and for children, the validity was for five years). It also included the thumbprint of the right thumb and any necessary remarks. Since 2010, it has also included additional features like a photo and a barcode.

This identification document is used for all kinds of procedures, from credit card purchases to identity verification, age verification, and more.

=== Name changes and new electronic format ===
In May 2015, the Dirección Nacional de Identificación Civil (DNIC) began issuing Uruguay's first electronic identity document. The new eID of Uruguay, including a polycarbonate card, contact and contactless electronic chips, and an advanced electronic signature. The introduction of the electronic document was gradual, and previously issued identity cards remained valid. The DNIC currently refers to the document as the Documento Nacional de Identidad (DNI).

In 2015, there were legal challenges from the name cédula de identidad to documento de identidad. However, the legislation enacted that year continued to use that term and authorized the Dirección Nacional de Identificación Civil to incorporate technical devices for storing identifying data into the DNI.

In 2026, the DNIC introduced a new design of the Documento Nacional de Identidad with additional security features, including a transparent window, laser-engraved multiple images, tactile personalization, a secondary photograph, relief printing on the polycarbonate card, optically variable ink, and a new serial-number format. The new design does not require holders of valid previous documents to replace them before their expiration.

The document is bilingual in Spanish and Portuguese. On the current card, the Portuguese-language designation is Carteira nacional de identidade.

The new identification card is constructed using polycarbonate and is laser-engraved, ensuring a desired durability of 10 years and preventing data erasure or tampering since the polycarbonate is essentially burned by the laser. It also includes translations into Portuguese, such as "Apellido/Sobrenome" (Surname), "Nombre/Nome" (Name), "Vencimiento/Vencimento" (Expiration), among others.

Furthermore, it incorporates three levels of security measures:

1. Visible security features, discernible to the human eye, including guilloché patterns and OVI ink.
2. Second-level security features, visible with specific instruments such as UV light or a microscope, including microtext and UV holograms.
3. Third-level security features, which require specialized equipment and are known only to the D.N.I.C.

Electronically, the identification card for adults contains two chips:

- One visible and contact chip containing electronic travel document information compliant with ICAO regulations for electronic travel documents. While it does not replace a passport due to ICAO regulations, it offers similar functionality to the contactless chip in new electronic passports and enables automatic immigration control at stations that support it in countries where travel with the ID card is permitted (South America), such as at the eGates of Carrasco Airport.
- One invisible and contactless chip with applications for electronic identification of individuals, designed for use in electronic services, both public and private. It features functionality to electronically read all cardholder data (Identification), compare a person's fingerprint electronically with the stored data to verify their identity (Match-On-Card), and includes a pair of keys and an electronic certificate for advanced electronic authentication and digital signatures.

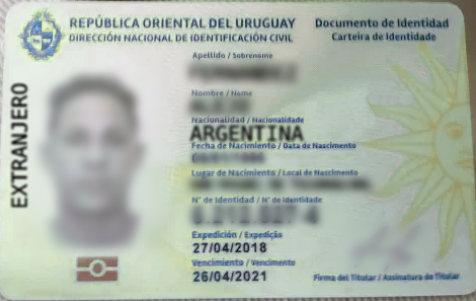
Uruguayan identification document for foreigners issued to an Argentine citizen.

Regarding naturalized citizens (legal citizens), their ID cards do not yet comply with ICAO 9303-3 7.1 standards because the D.N.I.C. interprets nationality differently from international concepts. They include the country or territory of birth of the naturalized Uruguayan citizen rather than their "Uruguayan" citizenship. This can result in rejection at eGates and by immigration authorities in other countries since the fields of issuance country and citizenship/nationality are inconsistent. In some cases, this may involve issuing ID cards with a nationality the individual does not possess or a nationality that does not exist (if born in a country that no longer exists or a territory without its own nationality).

It's worth noting that the electronic identification card for minors does not include any chips.

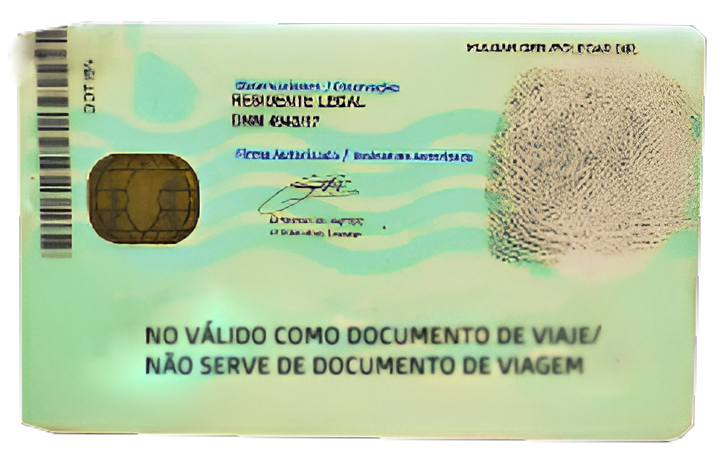
Reverse of a Documento de Identidad issued to an Argentine citizen

=== Applications and uses of the contactless chip ===
The contactless chip of the electronic ID card contains the electronic travel document application. This application is fully compatible with the specification established in the ICAO 9303 document for electronic travel documents and includes biometric information. Therefore, any system that implements the reading of such documents, including eGates, can wirelessly read and validate the information from your electronic ID card. Its use is designed for automatic immigration controls, where the control system can electronically read the traveler's data and, through facial recognition, verify that the person is indeed the one seeking passage, providing complete authentication. Since it also reads personal identification information, it can perform any additional checks deemed necessary, such as verification against travel clearance lists for any applicable legal reasons.

While the primary travel document is the passport, which also uses electronic technology with the same specifications, the ID card can be used as a travel document in South America and can, therefore, be used electronically as well. Moreover, this electronic travel document application can be used for any purpose by reading the information appropriately using a contactless reader in any system.

To prevent unauthorized data reading, for example, by a hidden reader on the street, the chip has Basic Access Control (BAC) protection. This mechanism requires presenting a shared secret to read the data. As indicated in the ICAO specification, this secret can be easily derived from information printed on the document, including the Machine-Readable Zone (MRZ), which can be optically read by a machine. This makes the procedure very simple when someone intentionally wants to electronically read the document, for example, during immigration control, but it prevents hidden data reading, thus safeguarding individual privacy. Additionally, the chip has protection through Active Authentication, which means that the data is electronically signed by the issuing authority, in this case, DNIC, and the chip also has a private key that allows it to be authenticated, ensuring it has not been cloned.

All functionalities and security mechanisms implemented in the contactless chip fully comply with ICAO 9303 standards, making their use standardized and widely supported. However, you can find documentation for using it in the following link: Electronic Travel Document (ICAO).

=== Applications and uses of the contact chip ===
This is the visible chip on the ID card, and it complies with ISO/IEC 7816 standards in all its sections. To access it, a standard smart card reader is required, which can be obtained in the market, in standard POS terminals (using the same physical interface as EMV cards) and is even embedded in some personal computers.

This chip has several functionalities that can be conceptually grouped into three applications:

=== Identification ===
Extraction of visible data from the plastic (excluding the fingerprint and signature images) in electronic format, enabling automatic reading of this information by a computer system, eliminating the need for manual data entry and streamlining registration processes, for instance.

=== Match on card ===
Biometric comparison of a captured fingerprint against the person's fingerprints stored in the document. It enables the reliable verification that a person is indeed the owner of a specific identity document, replacing the traditional human validation of comparing the person to the printed photo and significantly reducing the risk of identity theft.

=== Authentication and advanced electronic signature ===
The ID card contains a pair of keys and a certificate for Advanced Electronic Signature of a Natural Person. This application allows it to be used for electronically signing a document or performing strong authentication using that key pair and certificate. Its activation requires the entry of a PIN chosen by the user when they first receive the document.

In accordance with ISO 7816 specification, section 4, the electronic ID card is used within a system to which it is connected through the exchange of Application Protocol Data Unit (APDU) commands and responses. Therefore, any use of the card can be accomplished by exchanging the appropriate commands. The advantage of these commands is their flexibility, as they allow direct access to each function of the ID card at a much lower level than the three applications mentioned earlier. The downside is that the complexity level is high since the commands and responses essentially consist of sequences of bytes with minimal structure. Additionally, direct hardware access is required, which means that they must be executed on the machine to which the electronic ID card is directly connected (the client machine in a Web or Client-Server architecture).

== Overseas use ==
Holders of the Uruguayan Identification Document can enter all member and associate countries of the Mercado Común del Sur (Mercosur) without a passport. This applies to a total of nine South American nations.

== See also ==
- Uruguayan passport
