= Visa requirements for Uruguayan citizens =

Administrative entry restrictions

Visa requirements for Uruguayan citizens are administrative entry restrictions by the authorities of other states placed on citizens of Uruguay.

As of 2025, Uruguayan citizens had visa-free or visa on arrival access to 156 countries and territories, ranking the Uruguayan passport 23rd in the world according to the Henley Passport Index.

For traveling within South America (except the Guyanas and European dependencies), Uruguayans do not need to use a passport, as they may use their ID card.

== Visa requirements map ==
Visa requirements for Uruguayan citizens holding ordinary passports Uruguay Freedom of movement ID card travel Visa not required Visa on arrival eVisa Visa available both on arrival or online Visa required

== Visa requirements ==
Visa requirements for holders of normal passports traveling for tourist purposes:

Uruguay is a full member of Mercosur. As such, its citizens enjoy unlimited access to any of the other full members (Argentina, Brazil and Paraguay) and associated members (Bolivia, Chile, Colombia, Ecuador and Peru) with the right to residence and work, with no requirement other than nationality.

Citizens of these 9 countries (including Uruguay) may apply for the grant of "temporary residence" for up to 2 years in another country of the bloc. Then, they may apply for "permanent residence" just before the term of their "temporary residence" expires.

Country	Visa requirement	Allowed stay	Notes (excluding departure fees)
Afghanistan	eVisa		Visitors born in Afghanistan do not require a visa.; All visitors are fingerprinted, and are required to register with the Ministry of Foreign Affairs upon arrival.; The Taliban accepts visas issued by diplomatic missions not under its control.; e-Visa : Visitors must arrive at Kabul International (KBL).
Albania	Visa not required	90 days	
Algeria	Visa required		Application for a tourist visa to Algeria must be accompanied either by a certificate of accommodation.; Persons may be denied entry if entering with a passport containing visas or stamps issued by Israel.
Andorra	Visa not required		
Angola	Visa not required	30 days	Maximum 3 entries in calendar year
Antigua and Barbuda	eVisa		Holders of a visa or residency issued by Canada, USA, United Kingdom or a Schengen Member State can obtain a visa upon arrival that costs USD100 for a maximum of 30 days.
Argentina	Visa not required	3 months	Entry is allowed with a valid Uruguayan identity card that is less than 10 years old.; Uruguayans can live and work legally in Argentina under the Mercosur (and Associated Members) immigration agreement with no requirement other than being a citizen at birth or a naturalized citizen for over 5 years, and passing a background check.; Visitors are fingerprinted (Right thumb fingerprint) and photographed upon entry.; Uruguayans may request lawful permanent resident status in Argentina at any time.
Armenia	Visa not required	3 months	
Australia and territories	Online Visa required		May apply online (Online Visitor e600 visa).
Austria	Visa not required	90 days	90 days within any 180 day period in the Schengen Area.; Residence permit (Aufenthaltstitel) for stays of longer than 90 days obtainable after arrival under certain conditions.
Azerbaijan	Visa required		
Bahamas	Visa not required	3 months	
Bahrain	eVisa / Visa on arrival	14 days	Visa also obtainable online.
Bangladesh	Visa on arrival	30 days	Available at Dhaka, Chittagong, and Sylhet international airports.
Barbados	Visa not required	90 days	
Belarus	Visa not required	30 days	Must arrive and depart via Minsk International Airport.
Belgium	Visa not required	90 days	90 days within any 180 day period in the Schengen Area.
Belize	Visa not required	90 days	
Benin	eVisa	30 days	International Certificate of Vaccination or Prophylaxis required.; e-Visas are available for 30 or 90 days.
Bhutan	eVisa		Sustainable Development Fee of 200 USD per day for almost all visitors to Bhutan.; Holders of an application for a tourist visa can obtain a visa on arrival.
Bolivia	Visa not required	90 days	Entry is allowed with a valid Uruguayan identity card that is less than 10 years old.; Uruguayans can live and work legally in Bolivia under the Mercosur (and Associated Members) immigration agreement with no requirement other than being a citizen at birth or a naturalized citizen for over 5 years, and passing a background check.
Bosnia and Herzegovina	Visa not required	90 days	90 days within any 6-month period.; Registration with the local police within 24 hours of arrival is mandatory.
Botswana	Visa not required	90 days	90 days within any year period.
Brazil	Visa not required	90 days	Entry is allowed with a valid Uruguayan identity card that is less than 10 years old.; Uruguayans can live and work legally in Brazil under the Mercosur (and Associated Members) immigration agreement with no requirement other than being a citizen at birth or a naturalized citizen for over 5 years, and passing a background check.; Uruguayans may request lawful permanent resident status in Brazil at any time.
Brunei	Visa required		
Bulgaria	Visa not required	90 days	90 days within any 180 day period in the Schengen Area.
Burkina Faso	eVisa		International Certificate of Vaccination or Prophylaxis required.
Burundi	Visa on arrival	1 month	Visa on arrival obtainable at Bujumbura International Airport, and all land borders.
Cambodia	eVisa / Visa on arrival	30 days	Visa is also obtainable online.; All visitors are fingerprinted upon arrival and departure.
Cameroon	eVisa		International Certificate of Vaccination or Prophylaxis and current immunization records required.
Canada	Visa required		
Cape Verde	Visa on arrival		Not available at all entry points.
Central African Republic	Visa required		
Chad	Visa required		
Chile	Visa not required	90 days	Entry is allowed with a valid Uruguayan identity card that is less than 10 years old.; Uruguayans can live and work legally in Chile under the Mercosur (and Associated Members) immigration agreement with no requirement other than being a citizen at birth or a naturalized citizen for over 5 years, and passing a background check.
China	Visa not required	30 days	Visa-free from 1 June 2025 until 31 December 2026.; Visa free for Hong Kong and Macao for 90 days.
Colombia	Visa not required	90 days	90 days – extendable up to 180-days stay within a one-year period.; Entry is allowed with a valid Uruguayan identity card that is less than 10 years old.; Uruguayans can live and work legally in Colombia under the Mercosur (and Associated Members) immigration agreement with no requirement other than being a citizen at birth or a naturalized citizen for over 5 years, and passing a background check.
Comoros	Visa on arrival	45 days	
Republic of the Congo	Visa required		Visa not required for passengers with a V.I.P invitation letter.; International Certificate of Vaccination or Prophylaxis required.; A letter of invitation or written proof of a hotel reservation is required.
Democratic Republic of the Congo	eVisa	7 days	Passenger with a letter (Visa Volant) issued by the Ministry of Interior and Security can obtain a visa on arrival.; International Certificate of Vaccination or Prophylaxis required.; Registration required.
Costa Rica	Visa not required	90 days	
Côte d'Ivoire	eVisa	3 months	e-Visa holders must arrive via Port Bouet Airport.
Croatia	Visa not required	90 days	90 days within any 180 day period in the Schengen Area.
Cuba	Tourist card required / eVisa	90 days	Can be extended up to 90 days with a fee.
Cyprus	Visa not required	90 days	90 days within any 180 day period.
Czech Republic	Visa not required	90 days	90 days within any 180 day period in the Schengen Area.
Denmark	Visa not required	90 days	90 days within any 180 day period in the Schengen Area.
Djibouti	eVisa	90 days	
Dominica	Visa not required	90 days	
Dominican Republic	Visa not required	30 days	Can be extended up to 120 days
Ecuador	Visa not required	90 days	Entry is allowed with a valid Uruguayan identity card that is less than 10 years old.; Uruguayans can live and work legally in Ecuador under the Mercosur (and Associated Members) immigration agreement with no requirement other than being a citizen at birth or a naturalized citizen for over 5 years, and passing a background check.
Egypt	Visa on arrival	30 days	e-Visa issued for 30 days.; Visa-free travel for tourists arriving at Sharm El Sheikh, St. Catherine, or Taba airports and remaining in the Sinai resorts up to 15 days.
El Salvador	Visa not required	180 days	
Equatorial Guinea	eVisa		
Eritrea	Visa required		Permit required to leave capital.
Estonia	Visa not required	90 days	90 days within any 180 day period in the Schengen Area.
Eswatini	Visa not required	30 days	
Ethiopia	eVisa	up to 90 days	e-Visa holders must arrive via Addis Ababa Bole International Airport.
Fiji	Visa not required	4 months	
Finland	Visa not required	90 days	90 days within any 180 day period in the Schengen Area.
France and territories	Visa not required	90 days	90 days within any 180 day period in the Schengen Area.
Gabon	eVisa	90 days	e-Visas are available for one to six months.; Electronic visa holders must arrive via Libreville International Airport.; International Certificate of Vaccination or Prophylaxis required.
Gambia	Visa required		
Georgia	Visa not required	90 days	
Germany	Visa not required	90 days	90 days within any 180 day period in the Schengen Area.
Ghana	Visa required		International Certificate of Vaccination or Prophylaxis required.; Multiple entry visa valid for 1 year from date of issue upon arrival into Ghana is mandatory.
Greece	Visa not required	90 days	90 days within any 180 day period in the Schengen Area.
Grenada	Visa not required	3 months	
Guatemala	Visa not required	90 days	
Guinea	eVisa	90 days	International Certificate of Vaccination or Prophylaxis required.
Guinea-Bissau	Visa on arrival	90 days	
Guyana	Visa not required	90 days	
Haiti	Visa not required	3 months	
Honduras	Visa not required	90 days	
Hungary	Visa not required	90 days	90 days within any 180 day period in the Schengen Area.
Iceland	Visa not required	90 days	90 days within any 180 day period in the Schengen Area.
India	eVisa	30 days	e-Visa holders must arrive via 32 designated airports (Note: Ahmedabad; Amritsar; Bagdogra; Bengaluru; Bhubaneswar; Chandigarh; Chennai; Coimbatore; Delhi; Gaya; Goa-Dabolim; Goa-Manohar; Guwahati; Hyderabad; Indore; Jaipur; Kannur; Kochi; Kolkata; Kozhikode; Lucknow; Madurai; Mangaluru; Mumbai; Nagpur; Port Blair; Pune; Surat; Thiruvananthapuram; Tiruchirappalli; Varanasi; Visakhapatnam) or 5 designated seaports. (Note: Chennai; Cochin; Mormugao (Goa); Mumbai; Mangalore); An Indian e-Tourist Visa may only be obtained twice within 1 calendar year.; Foreigners of Pakistani origin or who hold a Pakistani Passport are not eligible for an e-Visa. Foreigners who are not Pakistani nationals, but whose parents or grandparents (either paternal or maternal) were born in, or were permanent residents in Pakistan, are also not eligible for an e-Visa.
Indonesia	Visa required		
Iran	eVisa	30 days	
Iraq	eVisa		
Ireland	Visa not required	90 days	
Israel	ETA-IL	90 days	
Italy	Visa not required	90 days	90 days within any 180 day period in the Schengen Area.
Jamaica	Visa not required	30 days	
Japan	Visa not required	90 days	
Jordan	eVisa / Visa on arrival	30 days	Visa can be obtained upon arrival, it will cost a total of 40 JOD, obtainable at most international ports of entry and land border crossings. (except King Hussein/Allenby Bridge); Not available at King Hussein/Allenby Bridge
Kazakhstan	eVisa		Visitors arriving from a country without Kazakh representation and holding an invitation letter, can obtain a single entry visa on arrival for a max. stay of 1 month.
Kenya	Electronic Travel Authorisation	90 days	Applications can be submitted up to 90 days prior to travel and must be submitted at least 3 days in advance.; eTA fee is 32.50 USD.; Proof of reservation at the hotel where visitors plan to stay is required (if staying with friends, an invitation letter is also acceptable).; Yellow fever vaccination certificate is required if coming from endemic countries.
Kiribati	Visa not required	90 days	May not exceed 90 days within any 12 months period.
North Korea	Visa required		
South Korea	Electronic Travel Authorization	90 days	All visitors are fingerprinted. From September 2021, travelers require the Korean Electronic Travel Authorization (K-ETA). The validity period is 3 years from the date of approval.
Kuwait	Visa required		
Kyrgyzstan	eVisa	60 days	e-Visa holders must arrive via Manas International Airport or Osh Airport or through land crossings with China (at Irkeshtam and Torugart), Kazakhstan (at Ak-jol, Ak-Tilek, Chaldybar, Chon-Kapka), Tajikistan (at Bor-Dobo, Kulundu, Kyzyl-Bel) and Uzbekistan (at Dostuk).
Laos	eVisa / Visa on arrival	30 days	18 (Note: Savannakhet Airport; Lanetoui - Mengkang (China); Meuangmom - Wan Pong (Myanmar); Banvang - Ban Khok Phai (Thailand); Namngeun - Huay Kon (Thailand); Paksan - Bueng Kan (Thailand); Paktaphan - Pak Saeng (Thailand); Pangmon - Ban Huak (Thailand); Phoudou (Thailand); Dak ta ock - Nam Giang (Vietnam); La Lai (Vietnam); Namkan (Vietnam); Namphao - Cau Treo (Vietnam); Namsoy - Na Meo (Vietnam); Naphao - Cha Lo (Vietnam); Pahang - Long Sap (Vietnam); Panghok - Tây Trang (Vietnam); Phoukeua - Bo Y (Vietnam)) of the 33 border crossings are only open to regular visa holders.; e-Visa may be used to enter Laos through the Luang Prabang, Pakse and Vientiane international airports, 3 Thai-Lao Friendship Bridges (Note: Vientiane (Friendship Bridge 1); Savannakhet (Friendship Bridge 2); Bokeo (Friendship Bridge 4)), in Boten (road and railroad), and in Vientiane (at Khamsavath railway station).; Visa on arrival is available at the Luang Prabang, Pakse and Vientiane international airports, 4 Thai-Lao Friendship Bridges (Note: Vientiane (Friendship Bridge 1); Savannakhet (Friendship Bridge 2); Khammouane (Friendship Bridge 3); Bokeo (Friendship Bridge 4)) and 7 border crossings. (Note: Nongnokkheane - Trapeang Kriel (Cambodia); Boten - Bo han (China); Golden Triangle/Samliemkham (Thailand); Khamsavath railway station (Thailand); Namheuang - Ban Na Kraseng (Thailand); Vang tao - Chongmek (Thailand); Dansavan - Lao Bảo (Vietnam))
Latvia	Visa not required	90 days	90 days within any 180 day period in the Schengen Area.
Lebanon	Free visa on arrival	30 days	Visa waiver granted if there is no Israeli visa or seal and traveler has a telephone number, an address in Lebanon, and a non refundable return or circle trip ticket.
Lesotho	eVisa	44 days	
Liberia	Visa required		
Libya	eVisa	30 days	
Liechtenstein	Visa not required	90 days	90 days within any 180 day period in the Schengen Area.
Lithuania	Visa not required	90 days	90 days within any 180 day period in the Schengen Area.
Luxembourg	Visa not required	90 days	90 days within any 180 day period in the Schengen Area.
Madagascar	Visa on arrival	60 days	
Malawi	eVisa / Visa on arrival	90 days	
Malaysia	Visa not required	90 days	All visitors are fingerprinted on arrival and departure.; Immigration offenses, such as visa overstaying, are punishable by caning.
Maldives	Free visa on arrival	30 days	
Mali	Visa required		
Malta	Visa not required	90 days	90 days within any 180 day period in the Schengen Area.
Marshall Islands	Visa on arrival	90 days	International Certificate of Vaccination or Prophylaxis required.
Mauritania	Visa on arrival		Available at Nouakchott–Oumtounsy International Airport.
Mauritius	Visa on arrival	60 days	
Mexico	Visa not required	180 days	
Micronesia	Visa not required	30 days	
Moldova	Visa not required	90 days	90 days within any 180-day period.
Monaco	Visa not required		
Mongolia	Visa not required	30 days	
Montenegro	Visa not required	90 days	Registration with the local police within 24 hours of arrival is mandatory.
Morocco	Visa required		
Mozambique	eVisa / Visa on arrival	30 days	Travelers must register on the e-Visa platform at least 48 hours prior to travel and pay a processing fee of 650 MT.
Myanmar	eVisa	28 days	e-Visa holders must arrive via Yangon, Nay Pyi Taw or Mandalay airports or via land border crossings with Thailand — Tachileik, Myawaddy and Kawthaung or India — Rih Khaw Dar and Tamu.; e-Visa is available for tourism only.
Namibia	Visa on arrival	3 months	Available at Hosea Kutako International Airport, Kalahari Border Crossing and Walvis Bay Airport.
Nauru	Visa required		
Nepal	Online Visa / Visa on arrival	90 days	Obtainable at Tribhuvan International Airport and certain land borders.; Total aggregate stay of no more than 150 days in any given calendar year.
Netherlands	Visa not required	90 days	90 days within any 180 day period in the Schengen Area.
New Zealand	Electronic Travel Authority	3 months	International Visitor Conservation and Tourism Levy must be paid upon requesting an Electronic Travel Authority.; Holders of an Australian Permanent Resident Visa or Resident Return Visa may be granted a New Zealand Resident Visa on arrival permitting indefinite stay (pursuant to the Trans-Tasman Travel Arrangement), subject to meeting character requirements and obtaining an Electronic Travel Authority prior to departure. Such travellers are not required to pay the International Visitor Conservation and Tourism Levy.
Nicaragua	Visa not required	90 days	Tourist card must be purchased upon arrival.
Niger	Visa required		
Nigeria	eVisa	90 days	Holders of written e-Visa approval issued by Immigration Authority can obtain a visa on arrival, provided holding a visa application form and e-Visa application payment receipt and holding an invitation letter from Nigerian company accepting immigration responsibilities.; International Certificate of Vaccination or Prophylaxis required if arriving from a country with a risk of yellow fever transmission.
North Macedonia	Visa not required	90 days	Registration with the local police within 24 hours of arrival is mandatory.
Norway	Visa not required	90 days	3 months within a 6-month period, regardless of previous time spent in other Schengen countries, but including time spent in other Nordic countries.
Oman	Visa not required / eVisa	14 days / 30 days	Holders of a visa or entrance stamp of the Emirate of Dubai that is valid for at least 21 days are visa exempt.; Holders of a visa for Qatar that is valid for travel to Oman and valid for at least one month are visa exempt when arriving directly from Qatar.
Pakistan	Online Visa	90 days	Free of charge
Palau	Free visa on arrival	30 days	
Panama	Visa not required	90 days	Denial of entry or transit to any person who has a criminal conviction.
Papua New Guinea	Easy Visitor Permit	60 days	Available at Gurney Airport (Alotau), Mount Hagen Airport, Port Moresby Airport and Tokua Airport (Rabaul).
Paraguay	Visa not required	90 days	Entry is allowed with a valid Uruguayan identity card that is less than 10 years old.; Uruguayans can live and work legally in Paraguay under the Mercosur (and Associated Members) immigration agreement with no requirement other than being a citizen at birth or a naturalized citizen for over 5 years, and passing a background check.
Peru	Visa not required	90 days	Entry is allowed with a valid Uruguayan identity card that is less than 10 years old.; Uruguayans can live and work legally in Peru under the Mercosur (and Associated Members) immigration agreement with no requirement other than being a citizen at birth or a naturalized citizen for over 5 years, and passing a background check.
Philippines	Visa not required	30 days	
Poland	Visa not required	90 days	90 days within any 180 day period in the Schengen Area.
Portugal	Visa not required	90 days	90 days within any 180 day period in the Schengen Area.
Qatar	Visa not required	30 days	
Romania	Visa not required	90 days	90 days within any 180 day period in the Schengen Area.
Russia	Visa not required	90 days	90 days within any 180 day period.
Rwanda	eVisa / Visa on arrival	30 days	Visitors are fingerprinted; International Certificate of Vaccination or Prophylaxis required.
Saint Kitts and Nevis	Visa not required	3 months	
Saint Lucia	Visa not required	6 weeks	
Saint Vincent and the Grenadines	Visa not required	3 months	
Samoa	Visa not required	60 days	
San Marino	Visa not required		
São Tomé and Príncipe	eVisa		International Certificate of Vaccination or Prophylaxis required.
Saudi Arabia	Visa required		
Senegal	Visa required		Visa not required for passengers with an official invitation letter.; International Certificate of Vaccination or Prophylaxis required.
Serbia	Visa not required	90 days	90 days within any 6-month period.
Seychelles	Electronic Border System	3 months	Application can be submitted up to 30 days before travel.; Visitors must upload a reservation confirmation(s) for each visitor's location of stay in Seychelles.; Yellow fever vaccination certificate is required if coming from endemic countries.; Payment of the fee (EUR 10) by credit or debit card.; Valid for one journey only and it expires once exit the country.
Sierra Leone	eVisa	3 months	International Certificate of Vaccination or Prophylaxis required.
Singapore	Visa not required	30 days	All visitors are fingerprinted upon arrival and departure
Slovakia	Visa not required	90 days	90 days within any 180 day period in the Schengen Area.
Slovenia	Visa not required	90 days	90 days within any 180 day period in the Schengen Area.
Solomon Islands	Visa required		
Somalia	Visa on arrival	30 days	All visitors must have an approved Electronic Visa (eTAS) before the start of their journey.
South Africa	Visa not required	90 days	Holders of passports without 2 blank pages may be refused entry.
South Sudan	eVisa		Obtainable online.; Printed visa authorization must be presented at the time of travel.
Spain	Visa not required	90 days	90 days within any 180 day period in the Schengen Area.
Sri Lanka	eVisa / Visa on arrival	60 days / 30 days	Sri Lanka introduced an ETA valid for 30 days.
Sudan	Visa required		
Suriname	Visa not required	90 days	An entrance fee of USD 50 or EUR 50 must be paid online prior to arrival.; Multiple entry e-Visa is also available.
Sweden	Visa not required	90 days	90 days within any 180 day period in the Schengen Area.
Switzerland	Visa not required	90 days	90 days within any 180 day period in the Schengen Area.
Syria	Visa required	15 days	Visa not required for foreign citizens with proof of Syrian origin, such as an identification card or passport.; Dual-citizen males ages 17–42 need military service book.
Tajikistan	eVisa	60 days	
Tanzania	eVisa / Visa on arrival	90 days	
Thailand	Visa not required	60 days	
Timor-Leste	Visa on arrival	30 days	Not available at all entry points.
Togo	eVisa	15 days	
Tonga	Visa required		
Trinidad and Tobago	Visa not required	90 days	
Tunisia	Visa required		
Turkey	Visa not required	90 days	90 days within any 180-day period.
Turkmenistan	Visa required		
Tuvalu	Visa on arrival	1 month	
Uganda	eVisa	3 months	Determined at the port of entry.; Must apply online at least 2 business days prior to travel.; Airlines may deny passengers permission to board flights to Uganda without proof that they had successfully applied for an e-Visa.; Ugandan immigration authorities may require additional documentation, including proof of a return plane ticket and detailed tour itinerary in Uganda.; International Certificate of Vaccination or Prophylaxis required.
Ukraine	Visa not required	90 days	90 days within any 180 day period.
United Arab Emirates	Visa not required	90 days	Extension possible with a fee.; Iris scan taken on arrival.
United Kingdom	Electronic Travel Authorisation	6 months	ETA required.; Up to 90 days if arriving from Ireland (Common Travel Area).
United States	Visa required		
Uzbekistan	eVisa	30 days	5-day visa-free transit at the international airports if holding a confirmed onward ticket for a flight to a third country.
Vanuatu	Visa not required	30 days	
Vatican City	Visa not required		Open borders but de facto follows Italian visa policy.; No foreign accommodations, residency restricted to Vatican citizens only.
Venezuela	Visa not required	90 days	Entry is allowed with a valid Uruguayan identity card that is less than 10 years old.
Vietnam	eVisa	90 days	Phú Quốc visa exemption for up to 30 days.
Yemen	Visa required		Registration mandatory.; Exit visa required for stays over 30 days.
Zambia	eVisa / Visa on arrival	90 days	Also eligible for a universal visa allowing access to Zimbabwe.; All visitors are fingerprinted.; Two blank pages required.; International Certificate of Vaccination or Prophylaxis required.
Zimbabwe	Visa on arrival	30 days	Also eligible for a universal visa allowing access to Zambia.; Tourism purposes only.

== Territories and disputed areas ==
Visa requirements for Uruguayan citizens for visits to various territories, disputed areas and restricted zones:

Visitor to	Visa requirement	Notes (excluding departure fees)
Abkhazia	Visa required	
(Argentina) (Misiones Province) Isla Apipé and Isla del medio	Visa not required	By being Argentine territories, the same visa policy applies.
Kosovo	Visa not required	90 days
Northern Cyprus	Visa not required	
Mayotte	Visa not required	90 days
Palestine	Visa not required	Arrival by sea to Gaza Strip not allowed.
Sahrawi Arab Democratic Republic	Unclear	Undefined visa regime in the Western Sahara controlled territory.
Réunion	Visa not required	90 days
Somaliland	Visa on arrival	30 days for 30 USD, payable on arrival.
Sudan outside Khartoum	Travel permit required	All foreigners traveling more than 25 kilometers outside of Khartoum must obtain a travel permit.
(Sudan) Darfur	Travel permit required	Separate travel permit is required.
British Indian Ocean Territory	Special permit required	Special permit required.
Hong Kong	Visa not required	90 days
Protected and restricted areas of India	PAP/RAP required	Protected Area Permit (PAP) required for whole states of Nagaland and Sikkim and parts of states Manipur, Arunachal Pradesh, Uttaranchal, Jammu and Kashmir, Rajasthan, Himachal Pradesh.; Restricted Area Permit (RAP) required for all of Andaman and Nicobar Islands and parts of Sikkim.; Some of these requirements are occasionally lifted for a year.
Iraqi Kurdistan	eVisa	30 days
(Kazakhstan) Baikonur & Priozersk	Special permission required	Special permission required for the city of Baikonur and surrounding areas in Kyzylorda Oblast, and the town of Priozersk near Almaty.
(Iran) Kish Island	Visa not required	Tourists for Kish Island do not require a visa.
Macau	Visa not required	90 days
(Malaysia) Sabah and Sarawak	Visa not required	
Maldives outside Malé	Permission required	Tourists are generally prohibited from visiting non-resort islands without the express permission of the Government of the Maldives.
(Tajikistan) Gorno-Badakhshan Autonomous Province	OIVR permit required	OIVR permit required.; Special permit required for Lake Sarez.
(China) Tibet Autonomous Region	TTP required	Tibet Travel Permit required in addition to Chinese visa.
(Saudi Arabia) Mecca and Medina	Special access required	
Taiwan	Visa required	
Closed cities of Turkmenistan	Special permit required	A special permit, issued prior to arrival by Ministry of Foreign Affairs, is required if visiting the following places: Atamurat, Cheleken, Dashoguz, Serakhs and Serhetabat.
(Vietnam) Phú Quốc	Visa not required	30 days
Yemen outside Sanaa or Aden	Special permission required	
Åland Islands	Visa not required	3 months
Anguilla	Visa not required	3 months
Aruba	Visa not required	30 days
Bermuda	Visa not required	6 months
(Caribbean Netherlands) (Bonaire, St. Eustatius and Saba)	Visa not required	180 days
British Virgin Islands	Visa not required	30 days
Cayman Islands	Visa not required	6 months
(Colombia) San Andrés and Leticia	Tourist Card on arrival	
Curaçao	Visa not required	6 months
(France) French West Indies (Martinique, Guadeloupe, Saint Martin and Saint Barthélemy)	Visa not required	3 months
Greenland	Visa not required	
Montserrat	Visa not required	6 months
Puerto Rico	Visa required	
Sint Maarten	Visa not required	6 months
Turks and Caicos Islands	Visa not required	90 days
(United States Virgin Islands) U.S. Virgin Islands	Visa required	
(Belarus) Brest and Grodno	Visa not required	10 days
Crimea	Visa not required	
Novorossiya	Restricted area	Crossing from Ukraine requires visit purpose to be explained to Ukrainian passport control on exit and those who entered from Russia are not allowed to proceed further into Ukraine.
Faroe Islands	Visa not required	
Gibraltar	Visa not required	
Guernsey	Visa not required	
Isle of Man	Visa not required	
(Norway) Jan Mayen	Permit required	24 hours
Jersey	Visa not required	
Closed cities of Russia	Special authorization required	Several closed cities and regions in Russia require special authorization.
South Ossetia	Visa not required	Multiple entry visa to Russia and three-day prior notification are required to enter South Ossetia.
Svalbard	Visa not required	Unlimited
Transnistria	Visa not required	24 hours
American Samoa	visa required	
(Australia) Ashmore and Cartier Islands	Special authorisation required	
(France) Clipperton Island	Special permit required	
Cook Islands	Visa not required	31 days
(Fiji) Lau Province	Special permission required	
French Polynesia	Visa not required	90 days
Guam	Visa required	
Niue	Visa not required	30 days
New Caledonia	Visa not required	90 days
Northern Mariana Islands	Visa required	
Pitcairn Islands	Visa not required	14 days
Tokelau	Entry permit required	
Galápagos	Pre-registration required	
(France) French Guiana	Visa not required	3 months
Falkland Islands	Visa not required	1 month
South Georgia and the South Sandwich Islands	Permit required	
Antarctica	Special permits required	

== Pre-approved visas pick-up ==
Pre-approved visas can be picked up on arrival in the following countries instead in embassy or consulate.

Pre-approved visas pick-up on arrival	Conditions
Bhutan	For a maximum stay of 15 days if the application was submitted at least 2 and a half months before arrival and if the clearance was obtained.
Cameroon	Must hold approval from the General Delegate of Security.
Eritrea	Must have a sponsor who must submit an application at least 48 hours before arrival.
Liberia	Available only if arriving from a country without a diplomatic mission of Liberia and if a sponsor obtained an approval.
Nigeria	Holders of a visa application who have a Nigerian company taking responsibility for them.
Sudan	Holders of an entry permit issued by the Ministry of Interior.
Turkmenistan	Holders of an invitation letter of the local company that was approved by the Ministry of Foreign Affairs.

== See also ==
- Visa policy of Uruguay
- Uruguayan passport
