= Uruguayan passport =

Passport of the Oriental Republic of Uruguay issued to Uruguayan citizens

Uruguayan passport; Pasaporte uruguayo
- Uruguayan passport front cover

- Picture page of a Uruguayan e-Passport
- Type: Passport
- Issued by: Uruguay
- Purpose: Identification
- Eligibility: Uruguayan citizenship
- Expiration: 10 years

Older uruguayan passport with "URUGUAYA" Nationality in the field.

Uruguayan passport (Spanish: Pasaporte uruguayo) is a travel document issued by the Oriental Republic of Uruguay to Uruguayan citizens. It grants the bearer international passage in accordance with visa requirements, serves as proof of citizenship and facilitates access to consular services provided by the country's embassies worldwide. Passports are issued by the National Directorate of Civil Identification, an agency of the Ministry of the Interior.

For travel within Mercosur—as well as Chile and Bolivia—Uruguayan citizens do not need a passport, as they may use their national identity document instead. Since October 16, 2015, the Ministry of the Interior has issued biometric passports that meet ICAO and U.S. Visa Waiver Program standards.

According to the 2025 Henley Passport Index, Uruguayan nationals had visa-free or visa on arrival access to 157 countries and territories, ranking the Uruguayan passport 23rd in terms of travel freedom.

== History ==
The first Uruguayan passport dates from 1925.

This passport did not came with nationality field, but with Ciudadano legal after the name, and "ciudadano legal" translated as "naturalized citizen". It had the portrait photo of the holder, both front and profile and translations for four languages: French, Italian, and english.

In 1922 the Uruguayan passport required paid stickers as a fee that were affixed to the passport.

In 1925, the Uruguayan "Legal" Nationality appears on the passport for first time. This one is written as "Ciudadano/a legal", "Ciudadano Legal" translated into Spanish as "naturalized citizen". In 1951, a new series of the Uruguayan passport was released with a green cover. This one had "Ciudadano Legal" after the name, but without nationality field as the previous. It has the same photo format, and translated to French.

In 1954, the passport became machine written with new features. The legal nationality appears as "Ciudadano/a legal uruguayo/a". It is only in Spanish and French.

In 1969, the passport's cover color was changed to blue. This passport embosses the Words "REPUBLICA ORIENTAL DEL URUGUAY", the coat of arms the Uruguay, and the Word "PASAPORTE". These passports have always carried English translation instead of French since that year, reflecting where global diplomatic norms had shifted by that point. They were written with pen, instead of machine written. The legal citizenship column was replaced with a new field that states the legal citizenship of the holder.

In 1984 there is another update on the Uruguayan passport. This one is Machine written again. This one has more security measures and in the first page there is the coat of arms of Uruguay. This one had a legal citizenship field, instead of putting it at "Nationality" field, like previous.

In 1998, the passport had many anti-counterfeiting features protection, and a field for the civil status, if the person is employed, and the photo does not include the profile photo anymore. Now the nationality of origin is indicated with the previous nationality of the person, which had at the origin, before becoming a legal citizen, with a clarification "(VEA PAG 7/LOOK PAGE 7)".

In 2014, the Uruguayan passport, adhering to the Mercosur Passport standards, had fairly new features, which includes the new map of South America, Safety measure visible under ultraviolet light. It is written in Spanish, English, and Portuguse, and in "OBSERVACIONES/ANOTAÇÕES/NOTES" may include a message such as "EL TITULAR DE ESTE PASAPORTE ES NACIONAL URUGUAYO, LEY 16.021/THE HOLDER OF THIS PASSPORT IS AN URUGUAYAN CITIZEN LAW 16.021/O TITULAR DESTE PASSAPORTE É CIDADÃO URUGUAIO LEI 16.021". The nationality field, like previous, has "VEA PAG 6/LOOK PAGE 6".

In 2015 the Uruguayan government has announced a new ePassport, completely revamped. This one has new features, and extends the durability from 5 years to 10 years and correlates it to ICAO standards. It removes portuguese translation, and did not mention the legal nationality, like previous.

== Legal citizens ==
Since the Constitution of Uruguay distinguishes between “nationality” and “citizenship,” only individuals born in Uruguay, or those born abroad to an Oriental (i.e., Uruguayan) parent or grandparent, are considered “Uruguayan nationals”. Consequently, Uruguay does not grant nationality through naturalization; instead confers "legal citizenship" to foreign residents who meet certain requirements. (Note: Only natural-born citizens—individuals born within the national territory, as well as children of a Uruguayan father or mother—hold Uruguayan nationality.)

Because of this constitutional terminological distinction, a foreigner who became a legal citizen and obtained a Uruguayan passport would have their original nationality listed in the passport’s “nationality” field. This has caused complications with visa requirements and international recognition, since nationality—not citizenship—is the basis for these procedures. In April 2025, the National Directorate of Civil Identification decided to replace the passport’s “Nationality” field with a combined “Citizenship/Nationality” field, using the URY code for both national and legal citizens so that the issuing country and the holder’s citizenship coincide. The “birthplace” field was also removed. However, in August 2025, after the new passports without the “birthplace” field were rejected in France, Germany, and Japan, Uruguay reversed the decision and reinstated the field.

By contrast, countries such as the United States also distinguish between citizens and nationals, but this does not create issues, as both categories use the same nationality code in the "nationality" field, ensuring consistency in international travel documents.

== Visa requirements ==
Countries and territories with visa-free entries or visas on arrival for holders of regular Uruguayan passports. Uruguay Freedom of movement ID card travel Visa free access Visa on arrival eVisa Visa available both on arrival or online Visa required

== See also ==
- List of passports
- Visa requirements for Uruguayan citizens
