= Visa policy of Uruguay =

Policy on permits required to enter Uruguay

Visitors to Uruguay must obtain a visa from one of the Uruguayan diplomatic missions unless they are citizens from one of the visa-exempt countries.

== Visa policy map ==
Visa policy of Uruguay Uruguay Visa not required - may enter with an ID card (90 days) Visa not required (90 days) Visa not required (30 days) Visa not required (90 days) if holding a valid visa issued by any European Union member state, Canada, the UK or the US; otherwise, visa required Visa required

== Visa exemption ==
=== Ordinary passports ===
Citizens of the following countries and territories may enter Uruguay without a visa for stays up to the duration listed below. The stay may be extended for an additional 90 days (except for citizens of Russia).

90 days

- All European Union member states

- Andorra
- Argentina^{ID}
- Armenia
- Australia
- Bahamas
- Barbados
- Belize
- Bolivia^{ID}
- Brazil^{ID}
- Canada
- Chile^{ID}
- Colombia^{ID}
- Costa Rica
- Dominica
- Ecuador^{ID}
- El Salvador
- Georgia
- Grenada
- Guatemala
- Guyana
- Honduras
- Hong Kong
- Iceland
- Israel
- Jamaica
- Japan
- Liechtenstein
- Macau^{1}
- Mexico
- Monaco
- Montenegro
- New Zealand
- Nicaragua
- Norway
- Panama
- Paraguay^{ID}
- Peru^{ID}
- Russia^{T}
- Saint Kitts and Nevis
- Saint Vincent and the Grenadines
- San Marino
- Serbia
- Seychelles
- Singapore
- South Africa
- South Korea
- Switzerland
- Trinidad and Tobago
- Turkey
- Ukraine
- United Arab Emirates
- United Kingdom^{2}
- United States
- Vatican
- Venezuela

30 days

- Malaysia
- Mongolia

_{ID - May enter with an ID card in lieu of a passport.}
_{T - For tourist purposes only.}
_{1 - For holders of a MSAR passport or a MSAR Travel Permit.}
_{2 - Including all types of British passports.}

Date of visa changes

Dates of entry into force of visa-free agreements:

- 1 February 1961: Israel
- 1 March 1961: United Kingdom
- 11 April 1974 / 2 May 1974: Japan
- 7 December 1982: Honduras
- 1 November 1984: France
- 18 December 1985: Portugal
- 7 July 1990: Guatemala
- 8 August 1991: Iceland
- 14 August 1991: Hungary
- 2 September 1991: Poland
- 10 February 1992: Costa Rica
- 15 February 1994: Nicaragua
- 11 November 1996: Turkey
- 1 April 1997: Croatia
- 25 April 1997: Barbados
- 1 August 1997: Jamaica
- 4 November 1997: Bahamas
- 10 September 1998: El Salvador
- 9 November 1999: Czech Republic
- 1 February 2000: Monaco
- 28 December 2000: Lithuania
- 12 June 2001: Cyprus
- 13 November 2003: Latvia
- 26 August 2004: Romania
- 1 January 2005: Hong Kong
- 25 May 2005: Bulgaria
- 26 December 2005: Estonia
- 27 December 2011: Russia
- 31 December 2011: Serbia
- 10 January 2013 / 29 November 2003: South Korea
- 24 November 2014: Saint Kitts and Nevis
- 29 March 2015: Saint Vincent and the Grenadines
- 11 April 2015: Armenia
- 27 April 2015: Dominica and Guyana
- 16 August 2015: Georgia
- 1 April 2018: Montenegro
- 29 April 2018: United Arab Emirates
- 10 June 2018: Mongolia
- 15 February 2019: Ukraine

Cancelled:

- 5 December 2018: Taiwan

- A visa is not required for airline crew members, and citizens of any country who were born in Uruguay as per their travel document.

==== Substitute visa ====
Citizens of China with a valid visa issued by any European Union member state, Canada, the United Kingdom or the United States may enter Uruguay without a visa for up to 90 days provided that the first entry is through Carrasco, Montevideo or Colonia.

=== Non-ordinary passports ===
- Holders of diplomatic or official/service passports of Albania, Angola, Argentina, Armenia, Azerbaijan (30 days), Belarus, Cambodia (30 days), Cuba, Dominican Republic, Egypt, Greece, India (30 days), Indonesia (30 days), Malaysia (30 days), Morocco, Namibia, Palestine, Russia (90 days within any 180-day period), Singapore, Suriname, Thailand (30 days), Tunisia and Vietnam (30 days) as well as holders of diplomatic passports of China (30 days) may enter Uruguay without a visa for up to 90 days (unless otherwise noted).
- Citizens of mainland China holding passports for public affairs may enter Uruguay without a visa for up to 90 days.

== See also ==
- Visa requirements for Uruguayan citizens
