= Citizenship of the Mercosur =

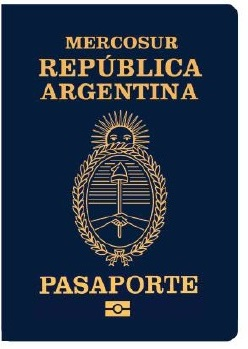
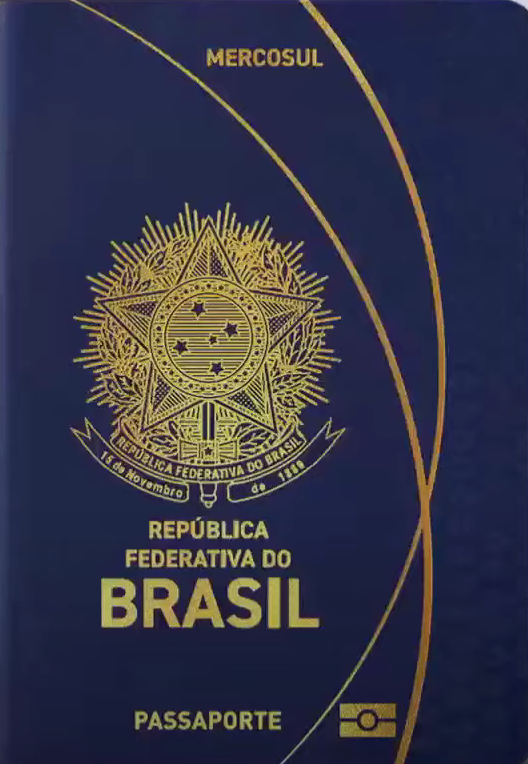
Mercosur member states use a common blue or dark blue passport booklet design with the name of the member state, their coat of arms and the title "Mercosur" (in the language(s) of the issuing country and its translation).

Citizenship of the Mercosur is granted to eligible citizens of the Southern Common Market member states. It was approved in 2010 through the progressive implementation of the Citizenship Statute, which culminated in its presentation as a non-binding document in 2021.

Mercosur citizens have the right to free movement, residence and employment throughout the bloc and in the five associated countries. Citizens still have free transport of goods, services and money, as well as equality of rights, harmonization of social security systems and labor laws.

== Benefits for citizens ==
=== Travel Documents ===
Nationals of member states (Argentina, Brazil, Bolivia, Paraguay and Uruguay) and Associated States (Chile, Colombia, Ecuador, and Peru) do not need a passport or visa to travel around the region, with only a national identity card or other document considered valid.

=== Residence Agreement ===
The Agreement grants the right to residence and work for citizens with no requirement other than nationality. Citizens of the Member States and Associated States that are part of the agreement enjoy a facilitated procedure for applying for a residence visa, as long as they have a valid passport, birth certificate, and a negative certificate of criminal record. It is possible to apply for the grant of "temporary residence" of up to two years in another country of the block. Before the expiry of the term of "temporary residence", the interested parties may request their transformation into permanent residence.

=== Social Security ===
The Agreement allows migrant workers and their families to have access to the benefits of social security by allowing nationals of one Member State to have accounted for their working time in another Member State for the purpose of granting retirement, invalidity, or death benefits.

=== Educational Integration ===
Mercosur has protocols for educational integration, which provide for the revalidation of diplomas, certificates, degrees, and the recognition of studies at the fundamental and secondary levels, technical and non-technical. The protocols also cover post-graduate studies. There is also the Regional Accreditation System for Mercosur Undergraduate Courses (ARCU-SUL) and the Integrated Mobility System (SIMERCOSUL).

== See also ==
- Treaty of Asunción
- Naturalisation
- Visa requirements for Argentine citizens
- Visa requirements for Bolivian citizens
- Visa requirements for Brazilian citizens
- Visa requirements for Paraguayan citizens
- Visa requirements for Uruguayan citizens
