= Visa policy of Argentina =

Policy on permits required to enter Argentina

Visitors to Argentina must obtain a visa from one of the Argentine diplomatic missions unless they are citizens of one of the visa-exempt countries.

Visitors must hold a passport (or an identity card issued by a Mercosur member state / associated state) valid for the period of intended stay, while Argentine citizens may enter with a valid passport or identity card (or salvocoducto, laissez-passer for Argentines).

== Visa policy map ==
Visa policy of Argentina Argentina Visa not required - may enter with an ID card (90 days) Visa not required (90 days) Visa not required (30 days) Electronic Travel Authorization (AVE) if holding a valid US visa; otherwise, visa required Visa required Travel Certificate required

== Visa exemption ==
Citizens of the following countries and territories may enter Argentina without a visa for the following period:

Extension of the period of stay is possible up to twice (30 or 90 days) the initially granted period of stay. Students can extend their stay up to 2 years each time.

90 days

- All European Union member states

- Andorra
- Armenia^{1}
- Australia
- Barbados
- Belarus^{2}
- Bolivia^{ID}
- Bosnia and Herzegovina
- Brazil^{ID}
- Canada
- Chile^{ID}
- Colombia^{ID}
- Costa Rica
- Dominica
- Ecuador^{ID}
- El Salvador
- Fiji
- Georgia
- Guatemala
- Guyana
- Honduras
- Hong Kong^{8}
- Iceland
- Israel
- Japan
- Liechtenstein
- Mexico
- Monaco
- Mongolia
- Montenegro
- New Zealand
- Nicaragua
- North Macedonia
- Norway
- Panama
- Paraguay^{ID}
- Peru^{ID}
- Qatar
- Russia^{1}
- Saint Kitts and Nevis
- Saint Lucia
- Saint Vincent and the Grenadines
- San Marino
- Serbia
- Singapore
- South Africa
- South Korea
- Suriname
- Switzerland
- Thailand
- Trinidad and Tobago
- Turkey
- Ukraine^{1}
- United Arab Emirates
- United Kingdom^{7}
- United States
- Uruguay^{ID}
- Vatican City
- Venezuela^{ID} ^{6}

30 days

- Grenada
- Jamaica^{5}
- Kazakhstan^{4}
- Macau^{3} ^{9}
- Malaysia^{5}

_{ID - May enter with an ID card if arriving from a Mercosur country.}
_{1 - 90 days within any 180-day period.}
_{2 - 90 days within a calendar year.}
_{3 - 30 days}
_{4 - 30 days within a calendar year.}
_{5 - 30 days for tourist purposes, 90 days for business purposes.}
_{6 - May enter with an expired passport or ID card.}
_{7 - Holders of British National (Overseas) passports granted 90 days visa-free access, visa-free access not applicable to holders of British subject or British Protected Person passports.}
_{8 - Residents of Hong Kong travelling on Hong Kong Special Administrative Region passports.}
_{9 - Residents of Macau travelling on Macau Special Administrative Region passports.}

Date of visa changes
- Unknown: Australia, Bolivia, Canada, Chile, Costa Rica, Cyprus, Dominica, Ecuador, Guatemala, Israel, Luxembourg, Monaco, New Zealand, Paraguay, Peru, South Korea, Sovereign Military Order of Malta, United States, Uruguay, Venezuela
- 15 July 1958: Netherlands
- 1 August 1958: Germany, Switzerland
- 29 September 1958: Liechtenstein
- 1 July 1959: Belgium
- 1 August 1960: Austria
- 1 January 1962: Denmark, Finland, Japan, Norway, Sweden
- 10 June 1965: Ireland
- 12 November 1965: Spain
- 21 May 1968: Italy
- 27 March 1969: Colombia
- 1972-1973: Mexico
- 31 January 1975: Greece
- 15 November 1979: Portugal
- 28 September 1984: Barbados
- 23 March 1988: El Salvador
- November 1989: Yugoslavia (applies today to North Macedonia, Montenegro and Serbia)
- 8 June 1990: United Kingdom (resumed)
- 11 June 1990: Vatican City
- 21 November 1990: Poland
- 15 December 1990: Hungary
- 4 July 1991: Malta
- 25 March 1992: Nicaragua
- 8 August 1992: Turkey
- 23 February 1993: Hong Kong (as British dependent territory)
- 20 August 1993: San Marino
- 3 May 1994: Slovenia (resumed)
- 7 October 1994: Malaysia
- 24 December 1994: France (resumed)
- 1 March 1995: Croatia (resumed)
- 7 May 1996: Honduras
- 9 July 1996: Panama
- 15 August 1997: Jamaica
- 10 September 1997: Andorra
- 22 July 1998: South Africa
- 5 August 1999: Singapore
- 2 January 2000: Czech Republic
- 21 April 2000: Trinidad and Tobago
- 22 April 2000: Brazil
- 24 May 2001: Saint Lucia
- 25 July 2001: Grenada
- 28 September 2001: Iceland
- 15 October 2001: Slovakia
- 30 December 2003: Lithuania
- 7 January 2004: Estonia
- 14 January 2004: Hong Kong
- 3 February 2004: Latvia
- 17 June 2004: Saint Vincent and the Grenadines
- 19 June 2004: Guyana
- 19 April 2005: Saint Kitts and Nevis
- 30 December 2005: Romania
- 29 August 2006: Bulgaria
- 13 October 2006: Thailand
- 29 June 2009: Russia
- 2 October 2011: Ukraine
- 19 January 2012: Armenia
- 8 May 2012: Suriname
- 31 October 2014: Kazakhstan
- 5 September 2015: Georgia
- 16 May 2017: United Arab Emirates
- 19 May 2017: Belarus
- 10 January 2018: Fiji
- 19 February 2018: Mongolia
- 4 November 2018: Qatar
- 13 November 2019: Macau
- 19 September 2023: Bosnia and Herzegovina

Cancelled:

- United Kingdom: 2 April 1982 (was resumed in 1990)
- France: 1 November 1982 (was resumed from 21 January 1985); 16 September 1986 (was resumed in 1994)
- Algeria: 21 January 1995
- Dominican Republic: 1 August 2012
- Haiti: 22 August 2018

Reciprocity fee:

- United States: imposed 28 December 2009, removed 24 March 2016
- Australia: imposed 28 December 2009, removed 1 July 2017
- Canada: imposed 28 December 2009, removed 1 January 2018

=== Other visa exemption ===
==== Special Regime ====
- Venezuela
Native citizens of Venezuela who are outside Argentina may enter without a visa for up to 90 days as of 20 September 2024. They may enter using a valid or expired passport or ID card (expired for no more than 10 years). Those wishing to apply for temporary or permanent residency under the Special Regime may complete the formalities upon arrival by paying ARS 50000 for the migration fee and ARS 6000 for the Argentine Identity Card (DNI).

==== Isla Apipé status ====
- Corrientes
Due to the special enclave of Isla Apipé of Corrientes, a Special permit is required for foreign citizens, crossing to the island.

==== Fee-exempt ====
- Morocco - Citizens of Morocco are exempt of paying the Visa fee (USD 150).

==== Visa-exempt with US Green Card or Visa ====
- China
- Dominican Republic
- India

Citizens of China, Dominican Republic and India may enter Argentina with a valid U.S. visa issued in the categories of B1/B2, B2, J, B1, O, P (P1, P2 Y P3), E and H-1B or a valid permanent residency card (U.S. green card). Other categories of U.S. visas are not eligible. Under this measure, eligible travellers can enter for up to 90 days.

==== Entry with ID card in lieu of a passport for visa-exempt third-country nationals residing in Mercosur countries ====
Third-country nationals who hold the following resident status in Mercosur member states and associate states can enter Argentina using an identity card issued by their country of residence in lieu of a passport as long as they are of a visa-exempt nationality:

- Bolivia - permanent and temporary residents
- Brazil - permanent and temporary residents
- Chile - permanent and temporary residents
- Colombia - permanent and temporary residents
- Ecuador - permanent and temporary residents
- Paraguay - permanent residents
- Peru - permanent and temporary residents
- Uruguay - permanent and temporary residents
- Venezuela - permanent residents

==== Entry with driver's license in lieu of a passport ====
- Brazil

- Citizens of Brazil in Puerto Iguazú land border post allows tourists with driving license, in lieu of passport who will stay less than 24 hours, but ID card is required to enter other cities.

== Electronic Travel Authorization ==
Citizens of most countries and territories that are not visa-exempt may apply for an Electronic Travel Authorization (or AVE) when travelling for tourism purposes. These countries must pay a fee of $400 to obtain the eVisa online.

For this, they exclusively need to be holders of a valid category B2/ J / B1 / O / P (P1-P2-P3) / E / H-1B visa issued by the US.

Regarding foreigners originating from countries that are visa-exempt for entry to the US, holders of valid and current ordinary, diplomatic, official or service passports, may process their AVE provided they demonstrate and are verifiable at least 1 entry to the aforementioned country, in the 2 years prior to the application or who have a valid permit issued by the Electronic System for Travel Authorization (ESTA) or B2 visas /J/B1/O/P (P1-P2-P3)/E/H-1B issued by the United States.

When approved, they are issued a printed confirmation of their eTA which they use to travel for 90 days without having to obtain a traditional visa.

This is not applicable to citizens of the following countries and territories:

- Afghanistan
- Algeria
- Azerbaijan
- Bangladesh
- Chad
- Comoros
- Egypt
- Haiti
- Iran
- Iraq
- Jordan
- Kosovo
- Kyrgyzstan
- Lebanon
- Liberia
- Libya
- Mali
- Mauritania
- Micronesia
- Morocco
- Nigeria
- North Korea
- Pakistan
- Palestinian Territories
- Somalia
- South Sudan
- Sri Lanka
- Sudan
- Syria
- Tajikistan
- Timor-Leste
- Tunisia
- Turkmenistan
- Uzbekistan
- Yemen

As of November 2019, citizens of countries that do not require a visa for the United States but who require a visa for Argentina may also apply for AVE if they had travelled to one of those two zones at least once in the past two years or if they hold and electronic authorization to travel issued by their authorities. Schengen visa holders were previously eligible to apply for an ETA; however, pursuant to Provision 538/2020 dated 27 January 2020, this eligibility has been temporarily suspended, and the suspension remains in effect as of June 2025.

== Eligible international organizations ==
Individuals holding the following travel documents are not required to obtain a visa for visits of 90 days or less when entering Argentina:

- United Nations Passport Holders
- Interpol Passport Holders

== Visa types ==
Argentine immigration law classifies foreign nationals admitted to Argentina as permanent residents, temporary residents or transitory residents. A person may be granted a visa corresponding to one of these categories when a visa is required for entry; however, not all foreign nationals require a visa, and the applicable requirements depend on nationality and the purpose of the stay.

=== Transitory visas ===
Transitory visas are intended for short-term stays and activities. Under Article 24 of Law 25.871, transitory residents include tourists, passengers in tránsito, persons travelling under the border-neighbouring transit regime, international transport crew members, seasonal migrant workers, academics, persons entering for medical treatment, and persons admitted for special reasons. A tourist may be authorized to remain in Argentina for up to 90 days, with a possible extension for another period of the same length. The Ministry of Foreign Affairs lists tourism, business, and participation in congresses and technical, scientific, artistic or professional activities among the visa purposes available to foreign nationals, with the applicable period of stay depending on the category.

=== Temporary visas ===
Temporary visas and residence permits are intended for foreign nationals who are admitted for a longer, specified period. Law 25.871 establishes temporary-resident subcategories including migrant workers, rentiers, pensioners, investors, scientists and specialists, athletes and artists, religious workers, persons undergoing medical treatment, academics, students, refugees and asylum seekers, nationals of MERCOSUR and certain associated states, persons admitted for humanitarian reasons, and other persons whose admission is considered to be in the national interest. The maximum period of a temporary residence varies according to its subcategory. For example, a migrant worker may be granted residence for up to three years, renewable, with multiple entries and exits and authorization to work under an employment relationship. Students are subject to specific visa categories. Students enrolled in the official education system may receive a visa for a stay of up to two years, while students in non-official educational programmes, international mobility programmes, exchanges, internships and scholarships may receive a visa for up to one year.

=== Permanent residence ===
Permanent residence is granted to foreign nationals who are admitted with the purpose of establishing themselves permanently in Argentina. Among the grounds for permanent residence are certain family relationships with Argentine citizens or permanent residents and, subject to the applicable requirements, established residence in Argentina. Argentine consular authorities may issue visas and entry permits for persons admitted as permanent or temporary residents, while transitory visas may also be issued by consular authorities. Applications for residence made within Argentina are generally handled by the Dirección Nacional de Migraciones, whereas applications made abroad may involve Argentine consular authorities.

=== Other visa categories ===
The Ministry of Foreign Affairs also lists specific visa categories for particular activities or circumstances, including business, employment, transferred personnel, family reunification, religious activities, and working-holiday programmes. The precise visa requirement depends on the applicant’s nationality, the purpose of the journey, and applicable bilateral or regional agreements.

=== Tourist visa ===
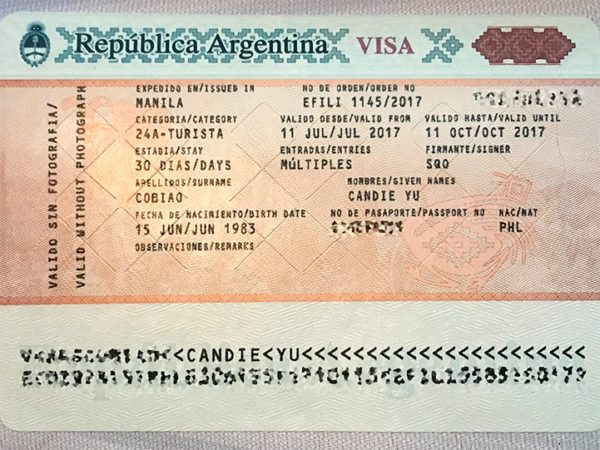
An Argentine visa, issued for a Philippine citizen.

Visas for tourism can be processed at any Consular Representation of the Argentine Republic. The authorized period of stay for this type of visa is up to 90 days.

This is not applicable to citizens of the People's Republic of China, as distinct requirements are enforced based on an existing international agreement pertaining to this matter.

=== Business Visa ===
Business visas can be processed at any Consular Representation of the Argentine Republic. The authorized period of stay for this type of visa is up to 60 days.

=== Visa for attending conferences and fairs, or conducting technical, scientific, artistic, or professional activities ===
Visas for attending conferences and fairs, or conducting technical, scientific, artistic, or professional activities can be processed at any Consular Representation of the Argentine Republic. The authorized period of stay for this type of visa is up to 30 days.

=== Student Visa +365 ===
These visas are intended for studying in the Argentine Republic for a period exceeding 365 consecutive days. Visas for educational purposes must be exclusively processed at the Consular Representation of the Argentine Republic corresponding to the foreigner's residence.

=== Student Visa -365 ===
These visas are designed for studying in the Argentine Republic for a period of fewer than 365 days. Visas for studies - 365 can be processed at the Consular Representation of the Argentine Republic located in the foreigner's place of residence.

=== Working Holiday Visa ===
Nationals of the following countries between the ages of 18 and 30 or 35 years may apply for a working holiday visa for 12 months in Argentina.

- Armenia
- Australia
- Austria
- Denmark
- France
- Germany
- Hungary
- Ireland
- Japan
- Netherlands
- New Zealand
- Norway
- Poland
- Portugal
- Slovakia
- Slovenia
- South Korea
- Spain
- Sweden

=== Visa for members of the Catholic clergy ===
Visas for members of the Catholic clergy involving the temporary residence of the foreigner in the country can only be processed at the Consular Representation of the Argentine Republic corresponding to the foreigner's residence.

=== Visas for Non-Catholic Religious clergy ===
Visas for non-Catholic religious practitioners that involve the temporary residence of the foreigner in the country can only be processed at the Consular Representation of the Argentine Republic corresponding to the foreigner's residence.

=== Visa based on nationality ===
Visas based on nationality can only be processed at the Consular Representation of the Argentine Republic corresponding to the foreigner's residence. This type of visa is available for nationals of Member or Associate States of MERCOSUR and allows for the temporary residence of the foreigner in the Argentine Republic for a period of 2 years.

=== Transferred Personnel Visa ===
Visa for individuals residing within the Argentine jurisdiction who seek entry into the Argentine Republic due to relocation by their employer.

=== Family Reunification Visa ===
Visas for family reunification can exclusively be processed at the Consular Representation of the Argentine Republic corresponding to the foreigner's residence. This type of visa is available for the spouse, child, or parent of a native, naturalized, or optioned Argentine citizen. Additionally, this visa can be obtained by the foreigner who is the spouse, parent, or child under 18 years of age (or older with a disability) of a foreigner with permanent residence.

=== Electronic Travel Authorization (ETA) ===
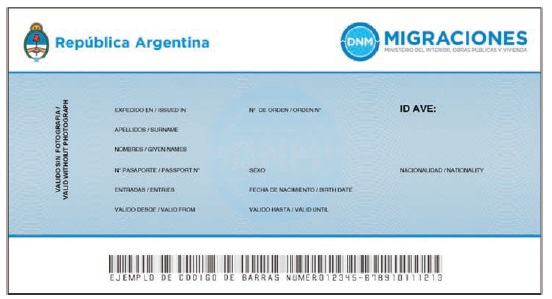
Specimen of regular Electronic travel authorization

More than a conventional visa, the Electronic Travel Authorization (ETA) is an electronic authorization designed for individuals already holding a visa from the United States.

The ETA applies to foreign nationals with valid and current regular passports traveling for tourism purposes to the Argentine Republic. They may apply for an ETA provided they can demonstrate, and it is verifiable, at least ONE (1) entry into the mentioned country in the TWO (2) years preceding the application. Alternatively, they should possess a valid permit issued by the Electronic System for Travel Authorization (ESTA) or visas B2/J/B1/O/P (P1-P2-P3)/E/H-1B issued by the United States of America.

The Disposición 1520/2024 clarifies that ETA is a "Previous visa".

For further information, see Electronic Travel Authorization.

==== Crew Electronic Travel Authorization ====
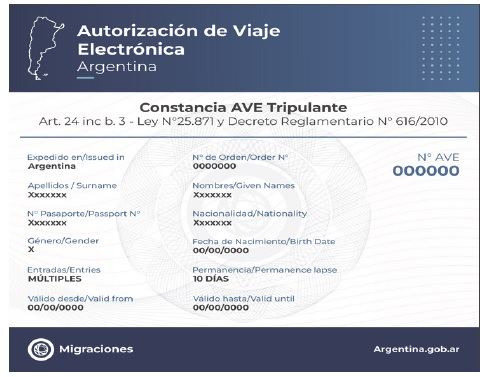
Specimen of Crew Electronic travel authorization.

The Crew Electronic Travel Authorization (AVE Tripulante) is governed by Argentine immigration regulations under Article 24(b) of Law No. 25.871 and Article 24(b)(3) of Regulatory Decree No. 616/10. The AVE Tripulante applies to foreign nationals from the Philippines and India who intend to enter Argentina to serve as crew members on Argentine or foreign vessels. Applications must be submitted by maritime agencies registered in the Registry of Maritime Agency Representatives.

To qualify, applicants must possess a valid travel document and an up-to-date Seaman's Book as proof of their crew member status. The AVE Tripulante remains conditional and is only finalized upon the traveler's arrival at an authorized border checkpoint, where entry is subject to the discretion of Argentine immigration officials.

=== Syria Program ===
The National Directorate of Migrations has formed an interagency Working Group to facilitate the implementation activities of the Syria Program, a special humanitarian visas program. Coordinated by the Directorate of International and Social Affairs of the National Directorate of Migrations (DNM), this Working Group aims to monitor the execution of the Syria Program. One of its objectives is to assist in the integration process of program beneficiaries through various measures. The Working Group also engages in meetings with interested communities and organized groups associated with evangelical and Catholic churches that are willing to collaborate with the situation of Syrians in the country.

=== Electronic Entry Processing (TIE 24 H) ===
The Electronic Entry Processing (TIE 24 H) system allows nationals from visa-exempt countries to apply online for authorization to engage in professional, artistic, business, or academic activities.

This system has replaced the previous requirement of completing white entry forms on aircraft before entering the country. To begin the application process, applicants must access the relevant online platform and subsequently contact their chosen consular representation for further steps.

=== Visa for Official Education Students (Art. 7 DNM Provision 2802/2023) ===
This visa allows individuals to study in Argentina at the secondary, tertiary, university, or postgraduate level in public or private institutions within the official education system. The authorized stay in the country is up to two years. Applications for study visas must be submitted exclusively at the Argentine Consular Representation corresponding to the applicant's place of residence.

The application process is personal, requiring the applicant to contact the appropriate Consular Representation to schedule an appointment and coordinate the submission of required documents.

=== Visa for Non-Official Education Students: Exchange Students, Interns, and Scholars (Arts. 8 to 13 DNM Provision 2802/2023) ===
This visa is intended for individuals studying in non-official education institutions, participating in international mobility programs, cultural exchange or volunteer programs, student exchange programs, or working as interns or scholars in Argentina. The authorized stay for this visa is up to one year.

The application process is personal, requiring the applicant to contact the appropriate Consular Representation to schedule an appointment and coordinate the submission of required documents.

Types of Visa Summary
Visa Type	Description
Tourist Visa	For tourism purposes. Processed at any Consular Representation, up to 90 days.
Business Visa	For business purposes. Processed at any Consular Representation, up to 60 days.
Conference & Professional Activities Visa	Visa for attending special events (such as fairs, professional activities, etc.). Processed at any Consular Representation, up to 30 days.
Student Visa +365	For studying over 365 days, processed at the respective Consular Representation.
Student Visa - 365	For studying under 365 days, processed at the Consular Representation.
Visa for Religious of the Catholic Clergy	Processed at the Consular Representation for temporary residence.
Visas for Non-Catholic Religious Clergy	Processed at the Consular Representation for non-Catholic religious practitioners.
Visa by Nationality	Processed at the Consular Representation based on nationality, valid for two years.
Work Visa	Processed at the Consular Representation for employment, personal application required.
Visa for Transferred Personnel	For individuals relocating by their employer within the jurisdiction.
Family Reunification Visa	Processed at the Consular Representation for family members of Argentine citizens.
Electronic Travel Authorization (ETA)	Electronic authorization for those with a US, for tourism.
Syria Program	A special humanitarian visa, coordinated by the National Directorate of Migrations for the integration of Syrian beneficiaries.
Electronic Entry Processing (TIE 24 H)	For nationals from visa-exempt countries engaging in professional, artistic, business, or academic activities. Processed online with subsequent consular contact.
Visa for Official Education Students (Art. 7 DNM Provision 2802/2023)	For studying at official educational institutions (secondary, tertiary, university, or postgraduate). Processed at the respective Consular Representation, up to two years.
Visa for Non-Official Education Students: Exchange Students, Interns, and Scholars (Arts. 8 to 13 DNM Provision 2802/2023)	For studying at non-official institutions, participating in exchange or volunteer programs, or working as interns/scholars. Processed at the respective Consular Representation, up to one year.

=== Biometrics collection ===
Argentina uses biometric identification as part of immigration control at designated points of entry and exit. The biometric data collected include a facial image’ and a fingerprint. Under the rules of the Dirección Nacional de Migraciones, persons undergoing immigration control are generally required to provide these data; the fingerprint requirement applies to persons aged five years or older.

Biometric identification is performed by the Dirección Nacional de Migraciones as part of the entry and exit control process. At border crossings equipped with biometric systems, migration-control personnel collect and verify the biometric data and record the movement in the National Register of Entry and Exit of Persons. The system includes facial-recognition technology, and automated biometric terminals may be used at designated international border crossings.

For persons applying for residence in Argentina, the Dirección Nacional de Migraciones also requires personal appearance for the taking of biometric data in procedures where such data are required.

==== Exemptions ====
The biometric requirement has limited exemptions. Persons who are physically unable to approach the immigration-control post may be exempted from both facial-image and fingerprint capture when the inability is duly substantiated. Examples specified by the regulations include a passenger on a medical aircraft and medical personnel providing necessary permanent assistance.

The following officials are also exempt from facial-image and fingerprint capture when covered by the applicable rules:

- Heads of state and government, heirs to reigning houses;
- The Vice President of Argentina, national and provincial ministers, governors;
- The Head of Government of Buenos Aires;
- The President of the Chamber of Deputies;
- The President of the Supreme Court, and holders of diplomatic passports.
- Members of an official delegation accompanying a head of state, head of government;
- Heir to a reigning house or foreign minister on an official visit may likewise be exempt, including certain officials, businesspeople, journalists, assistants and support personnel accompanying the delegation.

There are also procedural exceptions where biometric capture is technically impossible or where a person’s physical condition prevents a fingerprint from being obtained. In such cases, the incident is referred to the supervising immigration official for determination of a biometric exception. Religious or medical requirements concerning head or facial coverings do not in themselves constitute an exemption from photography; instead, the regulations provide procedures intended to permit the facial image to be taken while respecting those requirements.

Argentine nationals who re-enter the country within 30 days of leaving are not required to have a new facial image captured at certain equipped border crossings, although fingerprint capture remains mandatory under the applicable procedure.

== Transit ==
Foreign nationals entering Argentina as "transitory residents" may be admitted under the subcategories outlined in Article 24 of Law No. 25.871. The provisions for each subcategory are as follows:

=== Passengers in Transit ===
This subcategory applies to individuals entering Argentina with the sole purpose of traveling through the country en route to another state. These are the requirements:

- Must possess an Argentine consular visa specifying their status as a transit passenger.
- Authorized stay: Up to 10 consecutive days.

Extensions:

- The National Directorate of Migration may extend the stay by an additional 10 days under valid circumstances.

=== Passengers in Continuation of Travel ===
These are individuals entering Argentina to continue their journey to another destination, provided they exit the country within, 12 hours of arrival. These are the requirements:

- A confirmed outbound ticket.
- Declaration of status as continuation-of-travel passengers by the transporting company.
- No consular visa required.
- Conditions
- Passengers entering and exiting through the same port must remain within the premises of the airport, station, or port during refueling, maintenance, or transport changes.
- In cases of force majeure or unforeseen circumstances delaying departure beyond 12 hours, the National Directorate of Migration may authorize temporary departure from the port, subject to a request from and the sole responsibility of the transporting company.
- Documentation These are the requirements:
- The National Directorate of Migration may retain the passenger's documentation, issuing a certificate with their name, document type and number, and authorized duration of stay. Documentation will be returned upon confirmed departure. These are the requirements:
- Non-Compliance
- If a passenger fails to leave within the specified timeframe, a resolution equivalent to a border rejection will be issued, and the transport company must ensure the passenger's return.

=== Passengers Joining a Transport Crew ===
This subcategory applies to individuals entering Argentina to join the crew or staff of a transport vessel (either Argentine or foreign-flagged). These are the requirements:

- Authorized stay: Up to 10 days, renewable only under exceptional circumstances for another similar period.
- An Argentine consular visa is mandatory and must be obtained from the relevant Argentine Consular Representation.

== Travel Certificate required ==
Holders of passports of the following countries and territories must use a Travel Certificate issued by Argentina instead of a visa when travelling:

- Kosovo
- Sahrawi Arab Democratic Republic
- Taiwan

== See also ==
- Visa requirements for Argentine citizens
