= Visa requirements for Argentine citizens =

Administrative entry restrictions

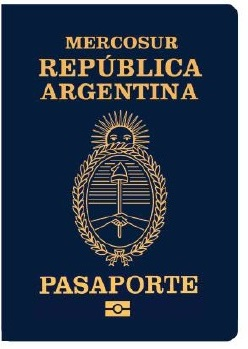
Argentine passport cover (2026)

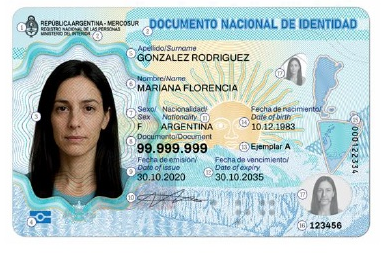
Argentine identity card (2026), valid for travelling to most South American countries.

Visa requirements for Argentine citizens are administrative entry restrictions by the authorities of other states placed on citizens of Argentina.

As of 2026, Argentina citizens had visa-free or visa on arrival access to 168 countries and territories. Ranking the Argentine passport 15th in terms of travel freedom (tied with the passports of San Marino, and tied with the second greatest access of all Mercosur single market member states, according to the Henley Passport Index.

== Visa requirements map ==
Visa requirements for Argentine citizens holding ordinary passports Argentina Freedom of movement / ID card valid Visa not required / ETA (Note: ETA required for Israel, Kenya, New Zealand, Saint Kitts and Nevis, Seychelles, South Korea and the United Kingdom.) Visa available both on arrival or online (Note: Including Indonesian e-VOA) Visa on arrival eVisa Visa required prior to arrival

== Recent ==
Recently visa requirements for Argentine citizens were lifted by China (May 2025), Macau SAR (October 2019) (Previously Visa on arrival), Qatar (November 2018), Mongolia (February 2018), Fiji (January 2018), Belarus (May 2017), United Arab Emirates (May 2017), Georgia (September 2015), Kazakhstan (October 2014), Suriname (May 2012), Armenia (January 2012), and Ukraine (October 2011)

Argentine citizens were made eligible for eVisas recently by Guinea and Malawi (October 2019), Pakistan (April 2019), Tanzania and Papua New Guinea (November 2018), Djibouti (February 2018), Azerbaijan (January 2017), India (e-Tourist visa from November 2014) and Myanmar (September 2014).

== Visa requirements ==
Country	Visa requirement	Allowed stay	Notes (excluding departure fees)	Reciprocity
Afghanistan	eVisa	30 days	e-Visa : Visitors must arrive at Kabul International (KBL).; Visitors born in Afghanistan do not require a visa.; All visitors are fingerprinted, and are required to register with the Ministry of Foreign Affairs upon arrival.; The Taliban accepts visas issued by diplomatic missions not under its control.	✓
Albania	Visa not required	90 days		X
Algeria	Visa required		Persons may be denied entry if entering with a passport containing visas or stamps issued by Israel.; Visitors on tours organized to some southern regions by an approved travel agency may obtain a visa on arrival for up to 30 days.	✓
Andorra	Visa not required			✓
Angola	Visa not required	30 days	30 days per trip, but no more than 90 days within any 1 calendar year for tourism purposes only.; Visitors must have a return/onward ticket and a hotel reservation confirmation.; An International Certificate of Vaccination is required.	X
Antigua and Barbuda	Visa not required	1 month	Stringent application of rules regarding proof of sufficient funds, return ticket and accommodation.	X
Armenia	Visa not required	180 days		✓
Australia	Online visa required		May apply online (Online Visitor e600 visa).	X
Austria	Visa not required	90 days	90 days within any 180 day period in the Schengen Area.	✓
Azerbaijan	eVisa	30 days	If staying in Azerbaijan for more than ten days, visitors must register at the State Migration Service within three days of arrival.; Applicants of Armenian ancestry or with Armenian visas in their passport may be denied a visa.; Travellers with a visa or evidence of travel to the now-defunct Republic of Artsakh (stamps) are permanently denied entry.	X
Bahamas	Visa not required	3 months		X
Bahrain	eVisa / Visa on arrival	14 days		X
Bangladesh	Visa on arrival	30 days	Available at Dhaka, Chittagong, and Sylhet international airports.; Not available at all entry points.	X
Barbados	Visa not required	90 days		✓
Belarus	Visa not required	90 days	90 days within any 1 calendar year.	✓
Belgium	Visa not required	90 days	90 days within any 180 day period in the Schengen Area.	✓
Belize	Visa not required			X
Benin	eVisa	30 days	Must have an international vaccination certificate.; Three types of electronic visa are offered: the e-Visa valid for 30 days for a single entry (50 EUR), the e-Visa valid for 30 days for several (multiple) entries (75 EUR), and the e-Visa valid for 90 days to make several (multiple) entries (100 EUR).	X
Bhutan	eVisa	90 days	The Sustainable Development Fee (SDF) of 200 USD per person, per night for almost all visitors to Bhutan. Additionally, if payment is made in US dollars from September 1, 2023 to August 31, 2027, the SDF is 100 USD.	✓
Bolivia	Freedom of Movement		ID card valid.; Argentines can live and work legally in Bolivia under the Mercosur (and Associated Members) immigration agreement with no requirement other than being a citizen at birth and passing a background check.	✓
Bosnia and Herzegovina	Visa not required	90 days	90 days within any 6-month period.; Registration with the local police within 24 hours of arrival is mandatory.	✓
Botswana	Visa not required	90 days	90 days within any 1-year period.	X
Brazil	Freedom of Movement		ID card valid.; Argentines can live and work legally in Brazil under the Mercosur (and Associated Members) immigration agreement with no requirement other than being a citizen at birth or a naturalized citizen, for over 5 years and passing a background check.; Argentines may request lawful permanent resident status in Brazil at any time.	✓
Brunei	Visa required			✓
Bulgaria	Visa not required	90 days	90 days within any 180 day period in the Schengen Area.	✓
Burkina Faso	eVisa		International Certificate of Vaccination or Prophylaxis required.	X
Burundi	Online Visa / Visa on arrival	1 month	Visa on arrival obtainable at Bujumbura International Airport, and all land borders.	X
Cambodia	eVisa / Visa on arrival	30 days	Visa is also obtainable online.; All visitors are fingerprinted upon arrival and departure.	X
Cameroon	eVisa		International Certificate of Vaccination or Prophylaxis and current immunization records required.	✓
Canada	Visa required		Argentine citizens who have held a Canadian visa in the last 10 years or who hold a valid United States non-immigrant visa can enter Canada solely with an eTA when arriving by air.	X
Cape Verde	Visa on arrival	30 days	Not available at all entry points.	X
Central African Republic	Visa required		International Certificate of Vaccination or Prophylaxis required.	✓
Chad	eVisa			✓
Chile	Freedom of Movement		ID card valid.; Argentines can live and work legally in Chile under the Mercosur (and Associated Members) immigration agreement with no requirement other than being a citizen at birth and passing a background check.	✓
China	Visa not required	30 days	Visa-free from June 1, 2025 until December 31, 2026.	X
Colombia	Visa not required		ID card valid.; Procedures are required for employment or residence, however they can freely enter as a tourist.	✓
Comoros	Visa on arrival	45 days		X
Republic of the Congo	Visa required		International Certificate of Vaccination or Prophylaxis required.; A letter of invitation or written proof of a hotel reservation is required.	✓
Democratic Republic of the Congo	eVisa	7 days	International Certificate of Vaccination or Prophylaxis required.; Registration required.	x
Costa Rica	Visa not required	90 days		✓
Côte d'Ivoire	eVisa	3 months	e-Visa holders must arrive via Port Bouet Airport.; International Certificate of Vaccination or Prophylaxis required.	X
Croatia	Visa not required	90 days	90 days within any 180 day period in the Schengen Area.	✓
Cuba	eVisa	90 days	Can be extended up to 90 days with a fee.; Cuba requires travelers to purchase a tourist card prior to arrival, which can be obtained from the airline or a Cuban diplomatic mission. Tourist cards are valid for one entry and a 30-day stay, which can be extended once by 90 days at a hotel or immigration office in Cuba.; Cuba requires travelers to have health insurance valid in Cuba, which can be purchased from the airline.	X
Cyprus	Visa not required	90 days	90 days within any 180 day period.	✓
Czech Republic	Visa not required	90 days	90 days within any 180 day period in the Schengen Area.	✓
Denmark	Visa not required	90 days	90 days within any 180 day period in the Schengen Area.	✓
Djibouti	eVisa	90 days		X
Dominica	Visa not required	6 months		✓
Dominican Republic	Visa not required	30 days		X
Ecuador	Freedom of Movement		ID card valid.; Argentines can live and work legally in Ecuador under the Mercosur (and Associated Members) immigration agreement with no requirement other than being a citizen at birth and passing a background check.	✓
Egypt	eVisa / Visa on arrival	30 days		X
El Salvador	Visa not required	90 days		✓
Equatorial Guinea	eVisa		International Certificate of Vaccination or Prophylaxis required if you are traveling from a country with risk of yellow fever.	x
Eritrea	Visa required			✓
Estonia	Visa not required	90 days	90 days within any 180 day period in the Schengen Area.	✓
Eswatini	Visa not required	30 days		X
Ethiopia	eVisa / Visa on arrival	up to 90 days	Visa on arrival is obtainable only at Addis Ababa Bole International Airport.; e-Visa holders must arrive via Addis Ababa Bole International Airport.; e-Visa is available for 30 or 90 days.	X
Fiji	Visa not required	4 months		✓
Finland	Visa not required	90 days	90 days within any 180 day period in the Schengen Area.	✓
France	Visa not required	90 days	90 days within any 180 day period in the Schengen Area.	✓
Gabon	eVisa	90 days	e-Visa holders must arrive via Libreville International Airport.; International Certificate of Vaccination or Prophylaxis required.	X
Gambia	Visa required		An entry clearance must be obtained from the Gambian Immigration prior to travel.; International Certificate of Vaccination or Prophylaxis required only for travellers arriving high risk countries and having transited for more than 12 hours	✓
Georgia	Visa not required	1 year		✓
Germany	Visa not required	90 days	90 days within any 180 day period in the Schengen Area.	✓
Ghana	Visa required		International Certificate of Vaccination or Prophylaxis required.	✓
Greece	Visa not required	90 days	90 days within any 180 day period in the Schengen Area.	✓
Grenada	Visa not required	30 days		✓
Guatemala	Visa not required	90 days		✓
Guinea	eVisa	90 days	International Certificate of Vaccination or Prophylaxis required.	x
Guinea-Bissau	Visa on arrival	90 days		X
Guyana	Visa not required	90 days		✓
Haiti	Visa not required	3 months		X
Honduras	Visa not required	90 days		✓
Hungary	Visa not required	90 days	90 days within any 180 day period in the Schengen Area.	✓
Iceland	Visa not required	90 days	90 days within any 180 day period in the Schengen Area.	✓
India	eVisa	30 days	e-Visa holders must arrive via 32 designated airports (Note: Ahmedabad; Amritsar; Bagdogra; Bengaluru; Bhubaneswar; Chandigarh; Chennai; Coimbatore; Delhi; Gaya; Goa-Dabolim; Goa-Manohar; Guwahati; Hyderabad; Indore; Jaipur; Kannur; Kochi; Kolkata; Kozhikode; Lucknow; Madurai; Mangaluru; Mumbai; Nagpur; Port Blair; Pune; Surat; Thiruvananthapuram; Tiruchirappalli; Varanasi; Visakhapatnam) or 5 designated seaports. (Note: Chennai; Cochin; Mormugao (Goa); Mumbai; Mangalore); An Indian e-Tourist Visa may only be obtained twice within 1 calendar year.; Foreigners of Pakistani origin or who hold a Pakistani Passport are not eligible for an e-Visa. Foreigners who are not Pakistani nationals, but whose parents or grandparents (either paternal or maternal) were born in, or were permanent residents in Pakistan, are also not eligible for an e-Visa.	X
Indonesia	e-VOA / Visa on arrival	30 days		X
Iran	eVisa	30 days	Passengers who have already made an application, at least two days before arrival, at the Iranian Ministry of Foreign Affair's e-Visa website and present the submission notification at the airport's visa desk may obtain a visa on arrival.	X
Iraq	eVisa	30 days		x
Ireland	Visa not required	90 days		✓
Israel	ETA-IL	90 days	3 months for tourism only.; Starting June 1, 2024, the ETA-IL (Electronic Travel Authorisation) will open for application submissions as a pilot program for German and American citizens. Applying will be voluntary and exempt from fees. The system will open to other nationalities on July 1, 2024.	✓
Italy	Visa not required	90 days	90 days within any 180 day period in the Schengen Area.	✓
Jamaica	Visa not required	30 days	Departure tax collected by airline for all arrivals by air.	✓
Japan	Visa not required	90 days	Persons who have been sentenced to 1 year or more of jail are not eligible for visa free travel to Japan and have to obtain visa.	✓
Jordan	eVisa / Visa on arrival	30 days	Not available at King Hussein/Allenby Bridge	X
Kazakhstan	Visa not required	30 days	30 days within any 1-year period.	✓
Kenya	Electronic Travel Authorisation	90 days	Applications can be submitted up to 90 days prior to travel and must be submitted at least 3 days in advance.; eTA fee is 32.50 USD.; Proof of reservation at the hotel where visitors plan to stay is required (if staying with friends, an invitation letter is also acceptable).; Yellow fever vaccination certificate is required if coming from endemic countries.	X
Kiribati	Visa not required	90 days	May not exceed 90 days within any 12 months period.	x
North Korea	Visa required			✓
South Korea	Electronic Travel Authorization	90 days	The validity period of a K-ETA is 3 years from the date of approval.	✓
Kuwait	Visa required			✓
Kyrgyzstan	Visa not required	30 days	30 days within any 60-day period.	X
Laos	eVisa / Visa on arrival	30 days	18 (Note: Savannakhet Airport; Lanetoui - Mengkang (China); Meuangmom - Wan Pong (Myanmar); Banvang - Ban Khok Phai (Thailand); Namngeun - Huay Kon (Thailand); Paksan - Bueng Kan (Thailand); Paktaphan - Pak Saeng (Thailand); Pangmon - Ban Huak (Thailand); Phoudou (Thailand); Dak ta ock - Nam Giang (Vietnam); La Lai (Vietnam); Namkan (Vietnam); Namphao - Cau Treo (Vietnam); Namsoy - Na Meo (Vietnam); Naphao - Cha Lo (Vietnam); Pahang - Long Sap (Vietnam); Panghok - Tây Trang (Vietnam); Phoukeua - Bo Y (Vietnam)) of the 33 border crossings are only open to regular visa holders.; e-Visa may be used to enter Laos through the Luang Prabang, Pakse and Vientiane international airports, 3 Thai-Lao Friendship Bridges (Note: Vientiane (Friendship Bridge 1); Savannakhet (Friendship Bridge 2); Bokeo (Friendship Bridge 4)), in Boten (road and railroad), and in Vientiane (at Khamsavath railway station).; Visa on arrival is available at the Luang Prabang, Pakse and Vientiane international airports, 4 Thai-Lao Friendship Bridges (Note: Vientiane (Friendship Bridge 1); Savannakhet (Friendship Bridge 2); Khammouane (Friendship Bridge 3); Bokeo (Friendship Bridge 4)) and 7 border crossings. (Note: Nongnokkheane - Trapeang Kriel (Cambodia); Boten - Bo han (China); Golden Triangle/Samliemkham (Thailand); Khamsavath railway station (Thailand); Namheuang - Ban Na Kraseng (Thailand); Vang tao - Chongmek (Thailand); Dansavan - Lao Bảo (Vietnam))	X
Latvia	Visa not required	90 days	90 days within any 180 day period in the Schengen Area.	✓
Lebanon	Free visa on arrival	1 month	Extendable for 2 additional months.; Granted free of charge at Beirut International Airport or any other port of entry if there is no Israeli visa or seal, holding a telephone number, an address in Lebanon, and a non refundable return of circle trip ticket.	X
Lesotho	Visa required			X
Liberia	e-VOA	3 months	International Certificate of Vaccination or Prophylaxis required only for travellers from high risk countries.	✓
Libya	eVisa		Holders of passports bearing an Israeli visa or entry/exit stamps from Israel are not allowed to enter Libya.	x
Liechtenstein	Visa not required	90 days	90 days within any 180 day period in the Schengen Area.	✓
Lithuania	Visa not required	90 days	90 days within any 180 day period in the Schengen Area.	✓
Luxembourg	Visa not required	90 days	90 days within any 180 day period in the Schengen Area.	✓
Madagascar	eVisa / Visa on arrival	90 days	For stays of 61 to 90 days, the visa fee is 59 USD.	X
Malawi	eVisa / Visa on arrival	90 days		X
Malaysia	Visa not required	90 days	All visitors are fingerprinted on arrival and departure.; Immigration offenses, such as visa overstaying, are punishable by caning.; The electronic Malaysia Digital Arrival Card must be submitted within three days before the date of arrival in Malaysia.	✓
Maldives	Free visa on arrival	30 days		X
Mali	Visa required		Letter of invitation required.; International Certificate of Vaccination or Prophylaxis required.	✓
Malta	Visa not required	90 days	90 days within any 180 day period in the Schengen Area.	✓
Marshall Islands	Visa on arrival	90 days		X
Mauritania	eVisa	30 days	Available at Nouakchott–Oumtounsy International Airport.; International Certificate of Vaccination or Prophylaxis required only for travellers arriving from high risk countries.	X
Mauritius	Visa not required	180 days	180 days per calendar year for tourism, 120 days per calendar year for business	X
Mexico	Visa not required	180 days	Visitors must obtain a Multiple Immigration Form. There is no charge for a tourist FMM for stays of less than 7 days when entering by land. For visitors staying more than 7 days and entering by land, it will cost 687 Mexican Pesos or nearly 40 USD. The FMM is required for all visitors entering via air, regardless of length of stay, and the cost is included in the traveler's airfare and remitted by the airline.	✓
Micronesia	Visa not required	30 days		X
Moldova	Visa not required	90 days	90 days within any 180 day period.; Registration upon arrival is mandatory.	X
Monaco	Visa not required			✓
Mongolia	Visa not required	90 days		✓
Montenegro	Visa not required	90 days	90 days within any 180 day period.; Registration with the local police within 24 hours of arrival is mandatory.	✓
Morocco	Visa not required	3 months		X
Mozambique	eVisa / Visa on arrival	30 days		X
Myanmar	eVisa	28 days	e-Visa holders must arrive via Yangon, Nay Pyi Taw or Mandalay airports or via land border crossings with Thailand — Tachileik, Myawaddy and Kawthaung or India — Rih Khaw Dar and Tamu.; e-Visa is available for tourism only.	X
Namibia	eVisa / Visa on arrival	3 months / 90 days	Available at Hosea Kutako International Airport, Trans Kalahari border post and Walvis Bay Airport.	x
Nauru	Visa required		Visas are issued with validity of 30 days.; Visa can be obtained in the Nauruan Press Office at the United Nations.	✓
Nepal	Online Visa / Visa on arrival	90 days	Obtainable at Tribhuvan International Airport and certain land borders.; Total aggregate stay of no more than 150 days in any given calendar year.	X
Netherlands	Visa not required	90 days	90 days within any 180 day period in the Schengen Area.	✓
New Zealand	NZeTA	3 months	International Visitor Conservation and Tourism Levy must be paid upon requesting an Electronic Travel Authority.; Holders of an Australian Permanent Resident Visa or Resident Return Visa may be granted a New Zealand Resident Visa on arrival permitting indefinite stay (pursuant to the Trans-Tasman Travel Arrangement), subject to meeting character requirements and obtaining an Electronic Travel Authority prior to departure. Such travellers are not required to pay the International Visitor Conservation and Tourism Levy.	✓
Nicaragua	Visa not required	90 days	Tourist card must be purchased upon arrival.	✓
Niger	Visa required		International Certificate of Vaccination or Prophylaxis required.	✓
Nigeria	eVisa	30 days	Business eVisas-on-arrival available for "Frequently Traveled Business Persons of International Reputes" or "Executives of Multi-national Companies", as well as for government officials; International Certificate of Vaccination or Prophylaxis required if arriving from a country with a risk of yellow fever transmission.	X
North Macedonia	Visa not required	90 days	Registration with the local police within 24 hours of arrival is mandatory.	✓
Norway	Visa not required	90 days	90 days within any 180 day period in the Schengen Area.	✓
Oman	Visa not required / eVisa	14 days / 30 days	For stays up to 30 days an eVisa can be obtained.; Holders of a visa or entrance stamp of the Emirate of Dubai that is valid for at least 21 days are visa exempt.; Holders of a visa for Qatar that is valid for travel to Oman and valid for at least one month are visa exempt when arriving directly from Qatar.	X
Pakistan	eVisa	3 months		X
Palau	Free visa on arrival	30 days		X
Panama	Visa not required	90 days	Denial of entry or transit to any person who has a criminal conviction.	✓
Papua New Guinea	eVisa	60 days	Available at Gurney Airport (Alotau), Mount Hagen Airport, Port Moresby Airport and Tokua Airport (Rabaul).	X
Paraguay	Freedom of Movement		ID card valid.; Argentines can live and work legally in Paraguay under the Mercosur (and Associated Members) immigration agreement with no requirement other than being a citizen at birth and passing a background check.	✓
Peru	Freedom of Movement		ID card valid.; Argentines can live and work legally in Peru under the Mercosur (and Associated Members) immigration agreement with no requirement other than being a citizen at birth and passing a background check.	✓
Philippines	Visa not required	30 days		X
Poland	Visa not required	90 days	90 days within any 180 day period in the Schengen Area.	✓
Portugal	Visa not required	90 days	90 days within any 180 day period in the Schengen Area.	✓
Qatar	Visa not required	90 days		✓
Romania	Visa not required	90 days	90 days within any 180 day period in the Schengen Area.	✓
Russia	Visa not required	90 days	90 days within any 180 day period.; As of June 30, 2025, foreigners entering Russia without a visa must pre-register in the Gosuslugi RuID Gosuslugi RuID mobile app and receive a digital code at least 72 hours before entry. Travelers holding ordinary passports from eligible countries and territories must obtain a ETA before their departure to Russia.	✓
Rwanda	eVisa / Visa on arrival	30 days	Visitors are fingerprinted.; International Certificate of Vaccination or Prophylaxis required only if arriving from high risk countries as defined by WHO.	X
Saint Kitts and Nevis	ETA	90 days	All travelers must apply for an ETA online.	✓
Saint Lucia	Visa not required	6 weeks		✓
Saint Vincent and the Grenadines	Visa not required	3 months		✓
Samoa	Entry permit on arrival	90 days		X
San Marino	Visa not required			✓
São Tomé and Príncipe	eVisa	15 days	International Certificate of Vaccination or Prophylaxis required.	X
Saudi Arabia	Visa required			✓
Senegal	Visa on arrival	1 month	International Certificate of Vaccination or Prophylaxis required.	X
Serbia	Visa not required	90 days	90 days within any 180 day period.	✓
Seychelles	Electronic Border System	3 months	Application can be submitted up to 30 days before travel.; Visitors must upload a reservation confirmation(s) for each visitor's location of stay in Seychelles.; Yellow fever vaccination certificate is required if coming from endemic countries.; Payment of the fee (EUR 10) by credit or debit card.; Valid for one journey only and it expires once exit the country.	X
Sierra Leone	eVisa	3 months		✓
Singapore	Visa not required	30 days	All visitors are fingerprinted upon arrival and departure.	✓
Slovakia	Visa not required	90 days	90 days within any 180 day period in the Schengen Area.	✓
Slovenia	Visa not required	90 days	90 days within any 180 day period in the Schengen Area.	✓
Solomon Islands	Free Visitor's permit on arrival	3 months	3 months within 12 months.; Visitors visa issued upon arrival for free.	X
Somalia	eVisa	30 days	All visitors must have an approved Electronic Visa (eTAS) before the start of their journey.	X
South Africa	Visa not required	90 days	Holders of passports without 2 blank pages may be refused entry.	✓
South Sudan	eVisa		Obtainable online 30 days single entry for 100 USD, 90 days multiple entry for 200 USD and 180 days multiple entry for 350 USD.; Printed visa authorization must be presented at the time of travel.	X
Spain	Visa not required	90 days	90 days within any 180 day period in the Schengen Area.	✓
Sri Lanka	ETA / Visa on arrival	30 days		X
Sudan	Visa required			✓
Suriname	Visa not required	90 days	An entrance fee of USD 50 or EUR 50 must be paid online prior to arrival.; Multiple entry e-Visa is also available.	✓
Sweden	Visa not required	90 days	90 days within any 180 day period in the Schengen Area.	✓
Switzerland	Visa not required	90 days	90 days within any 180 day period in the Schengen Area.	✓
Syria	eVisa		Registration required within 15 days.; Persons with passports bearing Israeli visas or entry/exit stamps are not allowed to enter.; Visa not required for foreign citizens with proof of Syrian origin, such as an identification card or passport.; Dual-citizen males ages 17–42 need military service book.; If not forgiven by the military, dual-citizens may apply for a visit visa once a year through the embassy.	X
Tajikistan	Visa not required / eVisa	30 days / 60 days	Visa also available online.; e-Visa holders can enter through all border points.	X
Tanzania	eVisa / Visa on arrival	90 days		X
Thailand	Visa not required	90 days		✓
Timor-Leste	Visa on arrival	30 days	Not available at all entry points.; For arrivals by air only.	X
Togo	eVisa	15 days		X
Tonga	Visa required			✓
Trinidad and Tobago	Visa not required	90 days		✓
Tunisia	Visa not required	90 days		X
Turkey	Visa not required	3 months	90 days within any 180-day period.	✓
Turkmenistan	Visa required		10-day visa on arrival if holding a letter of invitation provided by a company registered in Turkmenistan with a prior approval from the Foreign Ministry. Visitors can apply to extend their stay for an additional 10 days.; When transiting between two non-bordering countries, visitors can obtain a Turkmenistan transit visa for a five-day stay. This must be applied for in advance at the Turkmenistan Embassy. Visitors must also submit copies of the visas for the country of entry into Turkmenistan and the country of departure from Turkmenistan. Visa fee is 20 USD.	✓
Tuvalu	Visa on arrival	1 month		X
Uganda	eVisa	3 months	Determined at the port of entry.; Must apply online at least 2 business days prior to travel.; Airlines may deny passengers permission to board flights to Uganda without proof that they had successfully applied for an e-Visa.; Ugandan immigration authorities may require additional documentation, including proof of a return plane ticket and detailed tour itinerary in Uganda.; International Certificate of Vaccination or Prophylaxis required.	X
Ukraine	Visa not required	90 days	90 days within any 180 day period.	✓
United Arab Emirates	Visa not required	90 days	Extension possible with a fee.; Iris scan taken on arrival.	✓
United Kingdom	ETA UK	6 months	Up to 90 days if arriving from Ireland (Common Travel Area).	✓
United States	Visa required			X
Uruguay	Freedom of Movement		ID card valid.; Argentines can live and work legally in Uruguay under the Mercosur (and Associated Members) immigration agreement with no requirement other than being a citizen at birth and passing a background check.; Argentines may request lawful permanent resident status in Uruguay at any time.	✓
Uzbekistan	Visa not required	30 days		X
Vanuatu	Visa not required	30 days		X
Vatican City	Visa not required		Open borders but de facto follows Italian visa policy.; No foreign accommodations, residency restricted to Vatican citizens only.	✓
Venezuela	Visa not required	90 days		✓
Vietnam	eVisa	90 days	30 days visa free when visit Phu Quoc Island.	X
Yemen	Visa required			✓
Zambia	Visa not required	30 days	Visitors are eligible for a universal (KAZA) visa allowing access to Zimbabwe.	X
Zimbabwe	eVisa / Visa on arrival	1 month	Visitors are eligible for a universal (KAZA) visa allowing access to Zambia.	X

=== Requirements for entry to territories and states with limited recognition ===
Visa requirements for Argentine citizens for visits to various territories, disputed areas and partially recognized countries:

Visitor to	Visa requirement	Allowed stay	Notes (excluding departure fees)
Europe
Abkhazia	Visa required		Tourists from all countries (except Georgia) can visit Abkhazia for a period not exceeding 24 hours as part of an organized tourist group.
Northern Cyprus	Visa not required	90 days	
Faroe Islands	Visa not required		
Gibraltar	Visa not required		
Guernsey	Visa not required		
Isle of Man	Visa not required	6 months	
(Norway) Jan Mayen	Permit required		Permit issued by the local police required for staying for less than 24 hours. Permit issued by the Norwegian police for staying for more than 24 hours.
Jersey	Visa not required	6 months	
Kosovo	Visa not required	90 days	
South Ossetia	Visa required		To enter South Ossetia, visitors must have a multiple-entry visa for Russia and register their stay with the Migration Service of the Ministry of Internal Affairs within 3 days.
Transnistria	Visa not required		
Africa
British Indian Ocean Territory	Special permit required		Special permit required.
(Spain) Canary Islands	visa not required		
(Portugal) Madeira	visa not required		
Mayotte	visa not required		
Ascension Island	eVisa	3 months	3 months within any year period.
Réunion	visa not required		
Saint Helena	Visa not required		
Tristan da Cunha	Permission required		Permission to land required for 15/30 pounds sterling (yacht/ship passenger) for Tristan da Cunha Island or 20 pounds sterling for Gough Island, Inaccessible Island or Nightingale Islands.
Sahrawi Arab Democratic Republic	—N/a		
Somaliland	Visa required		30 days for 30 USD, payable on arrival.
Asia
(China) Hainan	Visa not required	30 days	Individual tourists need to select a tour agency and inform them their schedule.
Hong Kong	Visa not required	90 days	
Iraqi Kurdistan	eVisa	30 days	
(Iran) Kish Island	Visa not required		Visitors to Kish Island do not require a visa.
Macao	Visa not required	90 days	
(Malaysia) Sabah and Sarawak	Visa not required		These states have their own immigration authorities and passport is required to travel to them, however the same visa applies.
Palestine	Visa not required		Arrival by sea to Gaza Strip not allowed.
Taiwan	Visa required		
(Vietnam) Phú Quốc	Visa not required	30 days	
Caribbean and North Atlantic
Anguilla	Visa not required	3 months	
Aruba	Visa not required	30 days	30 days, extendable to 180 days.
(Portugal) Azores	visa not required		
Bermuda	Visa not required	6 months	Up to 6 months, decided on arrival.
(Netherlands) Bonaire, St. Eustatius and Saba	Visa not required	3 months	
British Virgin Islands	Visa not required	30 days	30 days, extensions possible.
Cayman Islands	Visa not required	6 months	
(Colombia) San Andrés and Leticia	Tourist Card on arrival		Visitors arriving at Gustavo Rojas Pinilla International Airport and Alfredo Vásquez Cobo International Airport must buy tourist cards on arrival.
Curaçao	Visa not required	3 months	
Greenland	Visa not required		
Guadeloupe	visa not required		
Martinique	visa not required		
Montserrat	Visa not required	6 months	
Puerto Rico	Visa required		
Saint Barthélemy	Visa not required		
Saint Martin	visa not required		
Saint Pierre and Miquelon	visa not required		
Sint Maarten	Visa not required	3 months	
Turks and Caicos Islands	Visa not required	90 days	
U.S. Virgin Islands	Visa required		
Oceania
American Samoa	Entry permit required		
(Australia) Ashmore and Cartier Islands	Special authorisation required		Special authorisation required.
(France) Clipperton Island	Special permit required		Special permit required.
Cook Islands	Visa not required	31 days	
Guam	Visa required		
New Caledonia	visa not required		
Niue	Visa not required	30 days	
Northern Mariana Islands	Visa required		
Pitcairn Islands	Visa not required	14 days	Landing fee 35 USD or tax of 5 USD if not going ashore.
(France) French Polynesia	Visa not required		
Tokelau	Entry permit required		
United States Minor Outlying Islands	Special permits required		Special permits required for Baker Island, Howland Island, Jarvis Island, Johnston Atoll, Kingman Reef, Midway Atoll, Palmyra Atoll and Wake Island.
Wallis and Futuna	Visa not required		
South America
Argentina - Misiones Isla Apipé and Isla del Medio	Freedom of movement	Unlimited stay	By being Argentine territories, the same visa policy applies.
Galápagos	Pre-registration required		60 days; Visitors must pre-register to receive a 20 USD Transit Control Card (TCT).
South Atlantic and Antarctica
Falkland Islands	Visa not required		A visitor permit is normally issued as a stamp in the passport on arrival, The maximum validity period is 1 month.
South Georgia and the South Sandwich Islands	Permit required		Pre-arrival permit from the Commissioner required (72 hours/1 month for 110/160 pounds sterling).
British Antarctic Territory	Special permit required		
French Southern and Antarctic Lands	Special permits required		
Argentine Antarctica	Special permit required		
(Australia) Australian Antarctic Territory	Special permit required		
(New Zealand) Ross Dependency	Special permit required		
(Australia) Heard Island and McDonald Islands	Special permit required		
(Antártica Chilena Province) Chilean Antarctic Territory	Special permit required		
(Norway) Peter I Island	Special permit required		
(Norway) Queen Maud Land	Special permit required		

=== Special/Restricted Areas ===
Country	Area	Maximum stay	Details
China	Tibet Autonomous Region	TTP required	Tibet Travel Permit required (10 USD).
Cyprus (United Nations)	UN Buffer Zone in Cyprus	Access Permit required	Access Permit is required for travelling inside the zone, except Civil Use Areas. Access only possible from areas controlled by the Republic of Cyprus or the Sovereign Base Areas
Greece	Mount Athos	4 days	A special permit required (25 euro for Orthodox visitors, 35 euro for non-Orthodox visitors, 18 euro for students). There is a visitors' quota: maximum 100 Orthodox and 10 non-Orthodox per day and women are not allowed.
Eritrea	Travel outside Asmara	Travel permit required	To travel in the rest of the country, a Travel Permit for Foreigners is required (20 Eritrean nakfa).
Fiji	Lau Province	Special permission required	Special permission required.
India	Protected and restricted areas	PAP/RAP required	Protected Area Permit (PAP) required for whole states of Nagaland and Sikkim and parts of states Manipur, Arunachal Pradesh, Uttaranchal, Jammu and Kashmir, Rajasthan, Himachal Pradesh. Restricted Area Permit (RAP) required for all of Andaman and Nicobar Islands and parts of Sikkim. Some of these requirements are occasionally lifted for a year.
Kazakhstan	Town of Baikonur and surrounding areas in Kyzylorda Oblast, and the town of Gvardeyskiy	Special permission required	Special permission required for the town of Baikonur and surrounding areas in Kyzylorda Oblast, and the town of Gvardeyskiy near Almaty.
Maldives	Non-resort islands except Malé	Permission required	With the exception of the capital Malé, tourists are generally prohibited from visiting non-resort islands without the express permission of the Government of Maldives.
North Korea	Areas outside Pyongyang	Special permit required	People are not allowed to leave the capital city, tourists can only leave the capital with a governmental tourist guide (no independent moving)
Russia	Closed cities and regions in Russia	Special authorization required	Several closed cities and regions in Russia require special authorization.
Sudan	Travel outside of Khartoum	Travel permit required	All foreigners traveling more than 25 kilometers outside of Khartoum must obtain a travel permit.
Sudan	Darfur	Travel permit required	Separate travel permit is required.
Tajikistan	Gorno-Badakhshan Autonomous Province	OVIR permit required	OVIR permit required, can be obtained with e-visa application for an additional $20. Locally it may be obtained for 15+5 Tajikistani Somoni. Another special permit (free of charge) is required for Lake Sarez.
Turkmenistan	Atamurat, Cheleken, Dashoguz, Serakhs and Serhetabat	Special permit required	A special permit, issued prior to arrival by Ministry of Foreign Affairs, is required if visiting the following places: Atamurat, Cheleken, Dashoguz, Serakhs and Serhetabat.
Yemen	Travel outside Sanaa or Aden	Special permission required	Special permission needed for travel outside Sanaa or Aden.
(United Nations) Korean Demilitarized Zone		Restricted zone	
(United Nations) UNDOF Zone and Ghajar		Restricted zone	

=== History ===
Argentine citizens were made eligible for e-Visas recently by Guinea and Malawi (October 2019), Pakistan (April 2019), Tanzania and Papua New Guinea (November 2018), Djibouti (February 2018), Azerbaijan (January 2017), India (e-Tourist visa from November 2014) and Myanmar (September 2014).

== Pre-approved visas pick-up ==
Pre-approved visas can be picked up on arrival in the following countries instead in embassy or consulate.

Pre-approved visas pick-up on arrival	Conditions
Bhutan	For a maximum stay of 15 days if the application was submitted at least 2 and a half months before arrival and if the clearance was obtained.
Cameroon	Must hold approval from the General Delegate of Security.
Eritrea	Must have a sponsor who must submit an application at least 48 hours before arrival.
Liberia	Available only if arriving from a country without a diplomatic mission of Liberia and if a sponsor obtained an approval.
Nigeria	Holders of a visa application who have a Nigerian company taking responsibility for them.
Sudan	Holders of an entry permit issued by the Ministry of Interior.
Turkmenistan	Holders of an invitation letter of the local company that was approved by the Ministry of Foreign Affairs.

== Vaccination requirements ==
=== Vaccination requirements map ===
Certain countries and territories require travellers arriving from Argentina to be vaccinated against specific diseases. This is a map of vaccination requirements for Argentins citizens.

Vaccination requirements for travellers arriving from Argentina Quadrivalent meningococcal vaccination (ACYW135) required (Note: Saudi Arabia: in the Hajj and Umrah zones only) Polio vaccination required Yellow fever vaccination required Vaccination not required

=== Quadrivalent meningococcal vaccination (ACYW135) ===
Meningococcal vaccination requirements for international travel
Country or territory	Details
Gambia	All travellers must show proof of vaccination with quadrivalent meningococcal vaccine (ACYW135) upon arrival.
Indonesia	Travellers arriving from or departing to Saudi Arabia must show proof of vaccination with quadrivalent ACYW-135.
Lebanon	Proof of vaccination with quadrivalent ACYW-135 is required for travellers departing Lebanon and going to Hajj, Umrah, and to certain African countries.
Libya	All travellers must show proof of vaccination with quadrivalent ACYW-135 upon arrival.
Philippines	Proof of vaccination with quadrivalent ACYW-135 is required for travellers going to Hajj and Umrah (in Saudi Arabia).
Saudi Arabia	Proof of vaccination is required for travellers 2 years of age and older who are Hajj or Umrah pilgrims and seasonal or pilgrim workers in Hajj and Umrah areas. Vaccination with quadrivalent ACYW135 (either polysaccharide or conjugate) must be issued not less than 10 days before arrival and not more than 3 years (polysaccharide vaccine) or 5 years (conjugate vaccine) before arrival. The immunisation certificate should clearly state if the traveller was vaccinated with the conjugate vaccine for the 5-year validity to apply.; Vaccination is also required for domestic pilgrims, residents of Mecca and Medina, and any persons participating in Hajj or Umrah or seasonal or pilgrimage work in Hajj and Umrah zones. At the discretion of the Ministry of Health, travellers may be administered prophylactic antibiotics upon arrival.

=== Polio vaccination ===
Polio vaccination requirements for international travel
Country	Details
Afghanistan	Travellers from polio-endemic countries (Pakistan) need Carte Jaune proof of polio vaccination (received between 4 weeks and 12 months before departure) upon arrival. Residents and ALL travellers staying in Afghanistan longer than 4 weeks need proof of polio vaccination (received between 4 weeks and 12 months before departure) when departing from Afghanistan.
Belize	Travellers from Afghanistan and Pakistan need Carte Jaune proof of OPV or IPV vaccination (received between 4 weeks and 12 months before departure) upon arrival. Belize residents travelling countries with confirmed polio cases also need proof of vaccination.
Brunei	Travellers from polio-exporting countries need Carte Jaune proof of OPV or IPV vaccination (received between 4 weeks and 12 months before departure) upon arrival.
Egypt	Travellers from Afghanistan, Angola, Benin, Cameroon, the Central African Republic, China, Congo-Kinshasa, Ethiopia, Ghana, Indonesia, Kenya, Mozambique, Myanmar, Niger, Nigeria, Pakistan, Papua New Guinea, Philippines, and Somalia need Carte Jaune proof of OPV or IPV vaccination (received between 4 weeks and 12 months before departure) upon arrival.
Georgia	Travellers from at-risk countries need Carte Jaune proof of OPV or IPV vaccination (received between 4 weeks and 12 months before departure) upon arrival. Travellers without proof are offered OPV vaccination upon arrival.
India	Travellers from Afghanistan, Congo-Kinshasa, Ethiopia, Kenya, Nigeria, Pakistan, Somalia, and Syria need Carte Jaune proof of OPV or IPV vaccination (received between 4 weeks and 12 months before departure) upon arrival.
Iran	Travellers from Afghanistan, Pakistan, and Nigeria need Carte Jaune proof of OPV or IPV vaccination (received between 4 weeks and 12 months before departure) upon arrival. Travellers without proof will be vaccinated upon arrival.
Iraq	Travellers aged 15+ from Afghanistan and Pakistan need Carte Jaune proof of OPV or IPV vaccination (received between 4 weeks and 12 months before departure) upon arrival; children under age 15 must have received three doses of polio vaccine before travel. Travellers without proof will be vaccinated upon arrival. Travellers departing Iraq to Afghanistan and Pakistan must also provide proof of vaccination upon departure.
Jordan	Travellers from Afghanistan and Pakistan need Carte Jaune proof of OPV or IPV vaccination (received between 4 weeks and 12 months before departure) upon arrival.
Lebanon	Travellers from and to polio-affected countries need Carte Jaune proof of OPV or IPV vaccination (received between 4 weeks and 12 months before departure) upon arrival.
Libya	Travellers from Afghanistan and Pakistan need Carte Jaune proof of OPV or IPV vaccination (received between 4 weeks and 12 months before departure) upon arrival.
Maldives	Travellers from and to polio-exporting countries, as well as Hajj and Umrah pilgrims, need Carte Jaune proof of OPV or IPV vaccination (received between 4 weeks and 12 months before departure) upon arrival.
Morocco	Travellers from polio-affected countries need Carte Jaune proof of OPV or IPV vaccination (received between 4 weeks and 12 months before departure) upon arrival.
Nepal	Travellers from Afghanistan, Kenya, Nigeria, Pakistan, and Papua New Guinea need Carte Jaune proof of OPV or IPV vaccination (received between 4 weeks and 12 months before departure) upon arrival.
Oman	Travellers from polio-exporting countries need Carte Jaune proof of OPV or IPV vaccination (received between 4 weeks and 12 months before departure) upon arrival.
Pakistan	Travellers from ALL countries planning to stay in Pakistan for more than 4 weeks need Carte Jaune proof of OPV vaccination upon arrival. Residents and ALL travellers staying in Pakistan longer than 4 weeks need proof of OPV vaccination when departing from Pakistan.
Philippines	Travellers from or to high-risk countries need Carte Jaune proof of polio vaccination upon arrival or before departure, respectively. Due to an ongoing local VDPV2 outbreak, the government recommends all others travellers to consider getting a polio vaccine or booster dose, depending on their situation.
Qatar	Travellers from polio-exporting countries (identified by Qatar as: Afghanistan, Nigeria, Pakistan and Philippines) need Carte Jaune proof of OPV or IPV vaccination (received between 4 weeks and 12 months before departure) upon arrival.
Saint Kitts and Nevis	Travellers from polio-endemic countries as identified by WHO (Afghanistan and Pakistan) need Carte Jaune proof of OPV or IPV vaccination (received between 4 weeks and 12 months before departure) upon arrival.
Saudi Arabia	Travellers from active-transmission (including wild or vaccine-derived poliovirus) and at-risk countries, as well as all travellers from Afghanistan, Congo-Kinshasa, Mozambique, Myanmar, Niger, Nigeria, Pakistan, Papua New Guinea, Somalia, Syria, and Yemen, need Carte Jaune proof of OPV or IPV vaccination (received between 4 weeks and 12 months before departure) upon arrival. Regardless of immunisation status, all travellers from Afghanistan, Myanmar, Nigeria, Pakistan, Papua New Guinea, Somalia, Syria, and Yemen will be given an Oral Polio Vaccine dose upon arrival.
Seychelles	Travellers from countries with polio outbreaks need Carte Jaune proof of OPV or IPV vaccination (received between 4 weeks and 12 months before departure) upon arrival.
Syria	Travellers from Cameroon, Equatorial Guinea, and Pakistan need Carte Jaune proof of OPV or IPV vaccination (received between 4 weeks and 12 months before departure) upon arrival. ALL Syria residents departing Syria to any country also need proof of vaccination.
Ukraine	Long-term visitors departing to states with wild or circulating vaccine-derived poliovirus transmission should present Carte Jaune proof of vaccination with at least one dose of bivalent OPV or IPV (received between 4 weeks and 12 months before departure). Persons obliged to undertake urgent international travel must be immunised with a single dose of polio vaccine before their departure. There is also risk of poliovirus transmission inside Ukraine itself, and travellers to Ukraine are recommended to be up to date with their polio vaccination before entry.

=== Yellow fever vaccination ===
Yellow fever vaccination requirements for international travel (July 2019)
Country or territory	Status	Vaccination required for travellers coming from	Traveller age
Albania	No risk	Yes	1 year or older
Algeria	No risk	Risk countries (Note: Also required for travellers having transited more than 12 hours through a risk country's airport.)	1 year or older
Angola	Risk country	All countries	9 months or older
Antigua and Barbuda	No risk	Yes	1 year or older
Aruba	No risk	yes	9 months or older
Australia	No risk	Yes	1 year or older
Bahamas	No risk	Yes	1 year or older
Brazil	No risk	No (Note: The WHO has designated (parts of) Argentina, Brazil and Peru as risk countries, but these countries do not require incoming travellers to vaccinate against yellow fever.)	1 year or older
Bahrain	No risk	Yes	9 months or older
Bangladesh	No risk	Yes (Note: Also required for travellers having transited any time through a risk country's airport.)	1 year or older
Barbados	No risk	Yes	1 year or older
Belize	No risk	Yes	1 year or older
Benin	Risk country	Yes	1 year or older
Bolivia	Risk country	Yes	1 year or older
Bonaire	No risk	Yes	9 months or older
Botswana	No risk	Yes	1 year or older
Brazil	Risk country	Yes	–
Brunei	No risk	Yes	9 months or older
Burkina Faso	Risk country	Yes	9 months or older
Burundi	Risk country	Yes	9 months or older
Cabo Verde	No risk	Yes	1 year or older
Cambodia	No risk	Yes	1 year or older
Cameroon	Risk country	All countries	9 months or older
Central African Republic	Risk country	All countries	9 months or older
Chad	Risk country	All countries	9 months or older
China	No risk	Yes	9 months or older
Christmas Island	No risk	Yes	1 year or older
Colombia	Risk country	Yes	1 year or older
Congo-Brazzaville	Risk country	All countries	9 months or older
Congo-Kinshasa	Risk country	All countries	9 months or older
Costa Rica	No risk	Yes	9 months or older
Côte d'Ivoire	Risk country	All countries	9 months or older
Cuba	No risk	Yes	9 months or older
Curaçao	No risk	Yes	9 months or older
Dominica	No risk	Yes	1 year or older
Dominican Republic	No risk	Yes	1 year or older
Ecuador	Risk country	Yes	1 year or older
Egypt	No risk	Yes	9 months or older
El Salvador	No risk	Yes	1 year or older
Equatorial Guinea	Risk country	Yes	9 months or older
Eritrea	No risk	Yes	9 months or older
Eswatini	No risk	Yes	9 months or older
Ethiopia	Risk country	Yes	9 months or older
Fiji	No risk	Yes	1 year or older
French Guiana	Risk country	All countries	1 year or older
French Polynesia	No risk	Yes	9 months or older
Gabon	Risk country	All countries	1 year or older
Gambia	Risk country	Yes	9 months or older
Ghana	Risk country	All countries	9 months or older
Grenada	No risk	Yes	1 year or older
Guadeloupe	No risk	Yes	1 year or older
Guatemala	No risk	Yes	1 year or older
Guinea	Risk country	Yes	9 months or older
Guinea-Bissau	Risk country	All countries	1 year or older
Guyana	Risk country	Yes	1 year or older
Haiti	No risk	Yes	1 year or older
Honduras	No risk	Yes	1 year or older
India	No risk	Yes	9 months or older
Indonesia	No risk	Yes	9 months or older
Iran	No risk	Yes	9 months or older
Iraq	No risk	Yes	9 months or older
Jamaica	No risk	Yes	1 year or older
Jordan	No risk	Yes	1 year or older
Kenya	Risk country	Yes	1 year or older
Kyrgyzstan	No risk	Yes	1 year or older
Laos	No risk	Yes	Unknown
Lesotho	No risk	Yes	6 months or older
Liberia	Risk country	Yes	9 months or older
Libya	No risk	Yes	1 year or older
Madagascar	No risk	Yes	9 months or older
Malawi	No risk	Yes	1 year or older
Malaysia	No risk	Yes	1 year or older
Maldives	No risk	Yes	9 months or older
Mali	Risk country	All countries	1 year or older
Malta	No risk	Yes	9 months or older
Martinique	No risk	Yes	1 year or older
Mauritania	Risk country	Yes	1 year or older
Mayotte	No risk	Yes	1 year or older
Montserrat	No risk	Yes	1 year or older
Mozambique	No risk	Yes	
Myanmar	No risk	Yes	1 year or older
Namibia	No risk	Yes	9 months or older
Nepal	No risk	Yes	1 year or older
New Caledonia	No risk	Yes	1 year or older
Nicaragua	No risk	Yes	1 year or older
Niger	Risk country	All countries	1 year or older
Nigeria	Risk country	All countries	9 months or older
Niue	No risk	Yes	9 months or older
North Korea	No risk	Yes	1 year or older
Oman	No risk	Yes	9 months or older
Pakistan	No risk	Yes	1 year or older
Panama	Risk country	Yes	1 year or older
Papua New Guinea	No risk	Yes	1 year or older
Paraguay	Risk country	Yes	1 year or older
Peru	Risk country	No	–
Philippines	No risk	Yes	1 year or older
Pitcairn Islands	No risk	Yes	1 year or older
Rwanda	No risk	Yes	1 year or older
Saint Barthélemy	No risk	Yes	1 year or older
Saint Helena	No risk	Yes	1 year or older
Saint Kitts and Nevis	No risk	Yes	1 year or older
Saint Lucia	No risk	Yes	9 months or older
Saint Martin	No risk	Yes	1 year or older
Saint Vincent and the Grenadines	No risk	Yes	1 year or older
Samoa	No risk	Yes	1 year or older
São Tomé and Príncipe	No risk	Yes	1 year or older
Saudi Arabia	No risk	Yes	1 year or older
Senegal	Risk country	Yes	9 months or older
Seychelles	No risk	Yes	1 year or older
Sierra Leone	Risk country	All countries	Unknown
Singapore	No risk	Yes	1 year or older
Sint Eustatius	No risk	Yes	6 months or older
Sint Maarten	No risk	Yes	9 months or older
Solomon Islands	No risk	Yes	
Somalia	No risk	Yes	9 months or older
South Africa	No risk	Yes	1 year or older
South Sudan	Risk country	All countries	9 months or older
Sri Lanka	No risk	Yes	9 months or older
Sudan	Risk country	Yes	1 year or older
Suriname	Risk country	Yes	1 year or older
Tanzania	No risk	Yes	1 year or older
Thailand	No risk	Yes	1 year or older
Togo	Risk country	All countries	9 months or older
Trinidad and Tobago	Risk region: Trinidad	Yes	1 year or older
Uganda	Risk country	All countries	1 year or older
United Arab Emirates	No risk	Yes	9 months or older
Venezuela	Risk country	Yes	1 year or older
Wallis and Futuna	No risk	Yes	1 year or older
Zambia	No risk	Yes	1 year or older
Zimbabwe	No risk	Yes	9 months or older

=== COVID-19 vaccination ===
Many countries increasingly consider the vaccination status of travellers with regard to quarantine requirements or when deciding to allow them entry at all. This is justified by research that shows that the Pfizer vaccine effect lasts for six months or so.

== Passport requirements ==
=== Passport not required ===
Argentine Identity card is valid for these countries:

- Mercosur (Except Guyana)
- Andean Community
- Chile

=== Blank passport pages ===
Many countries require a minimum number of blank pages to be available in the passport being presented, typically one or two pages. Endorsement pages, which often appear after the visa pages, are not counted as being valid or available.

=== Passport validity length ===
Many countries require passports to be valid for at least 6 months upon arrival and one or two blank pages.

Countries requiring passports to be valid at least 6 months on arrival include Afghanistan, Algeria, Bangladesh, Bhutan, Botswana, Brunei, Cambodia, Comoros, Côte d'Ivoire, Ecuador, Egypt, El Salvador, Fiji, Guyana, Haiti, Indonesia, Iran, Iraq (except when arriving at Basra – 3 months and Erbil or Sulaimaniyah – on arrival), Jordan, Kenya, Kiribati, Kuwait, Laos, Libya, Madagascar, Malaysia, Marshall Islands, Mauritania, Mongolia, Myanmar, Namibia, Nicaragua, Nigeria, Oman, Palau, Papua New Guinea, Philippines, Rwanda, Samoa, Saudi Arabia, Singapore, Solomon Islands, Somalia, Sri Lanka, Sudan, Suriname, Syria, Taiwan, Tanzania, Timor-Leste, Tonga, Tuvalu, Uganda, United Arab Emirates, Vanuatu, Venezuela, Vietnam, Yemen.

Turkey usually requires passports to be valid for at least 5 months (150 days) upon entry, but for German citizens Turkish authorities allow to enter even with passport or identity card expired within last year.

Countries requiring passport validity of at least 4 months on arrival include Azerbaijan, Micronesia, Zambia.

Countries requiring passport validity of at least 3 months on arrival include Albania, Bosnia and Herzegowina, Honduras, Moldova, Nauru, North Macedonia, Panama, Qatar, Senegal and French territories in the Pacific (i.e. French Polynesia, New Caledonia and Wallis and Futuna)

Countries requiring passport validity of at least 1 month on arrival include Eritrea, Hong Kong, Lebanon, Macau, Maldives, New Zealand, South Africa

Other countries require either a passport valid on arrival or passport valid throughout the period of intended stay.

=== Medical passport ===
Many African countries, including Benin, Burkina Faso, Burundi, Cameroon, Central African Republic, Democratic Republic of the Congo, Republic of the Congo, Côte d'Ivoire, Gabon, Guinea-Bissau, Kenya, Liberia, Niger, Rwanda, Sierra Leone and Togo, require all incoming passengers older than nine months to one year to have a current International Certificate of Vaccination or Prophylaxis, as does the South American territory of French Guiana.

== Entry bans ==
=== Criminal record ===
Some countries, including Australia, Canada, Fiji, New Zealand and the United States, routinely deny entry to non-citizens who have a criminal record, while others impose restrictions depending on the type of conviction and the length of the sentence.

=== Persona non grata ===
The government of a country can declare a diplomat persona non grata, banning them from entering the country or expelling them if they have already entered. In non-diplomatic use, the authorities of a country may also declare a foreigner persona non grata permanently or temporarily, usually because of unlawful activity.

=== Israeli stamps ===
Kuwait, Lebanon, Libya, and Yemen do not allow entry to people with passport stamps from Israel or whose passports have either a used or an unused Israeli visa, or where there is evidence of previous travel to Israel such as entry or exit stamps from neighbouring border posts in transit countries such as Jordan and Egypt.

To circumvent this Arab League boycott of Israel, the Israeli immigration services have now mostly ceased to stamp foreign nationals' passports on either entry to or exit from Israel (unless the entry is for some work-related purposes). Since 15 January 2013, Israel no longer stamps foreign passports at Ben Gurion Airport. Passports are still (as of 22 June 2017) stamped at Erez when passing into and out of Gaza.

Iran refuses admission to holders of passports containing an Israeli visa or stamp that is less than 12 months old.

== Consular protection of Argentine citizens abroad ==
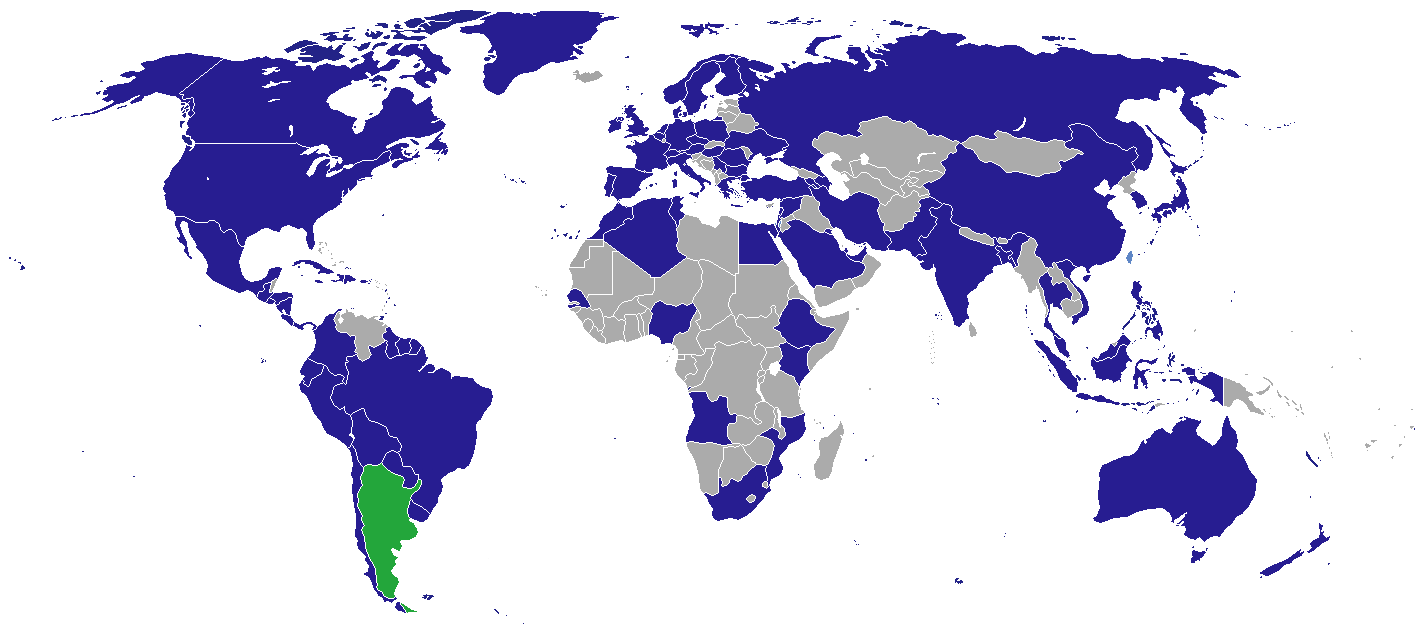
Argentine diplomatic missions, including embassies (blue), interests sections, and other representations (light blue)

The Argentine has the second most diplomatic missions of any country in the South America. See also List of diplomatic missions of Argentina and List of diplomatic missions in Argentina.

The Ministry of the Interior regularly publishes travel alerts.

== See also ==
- Argentine passport
- Visa policy of Argentina
- Documento Nacional de Identidad (Argentina)
