= List of diplomatic missions in Argentina =

This is a list of diplomatic missions in Argentina. There are currently 87 embassies in Buenos Aires, and many countries maintain consulates in other Argentine cities (not including honorary consulates).

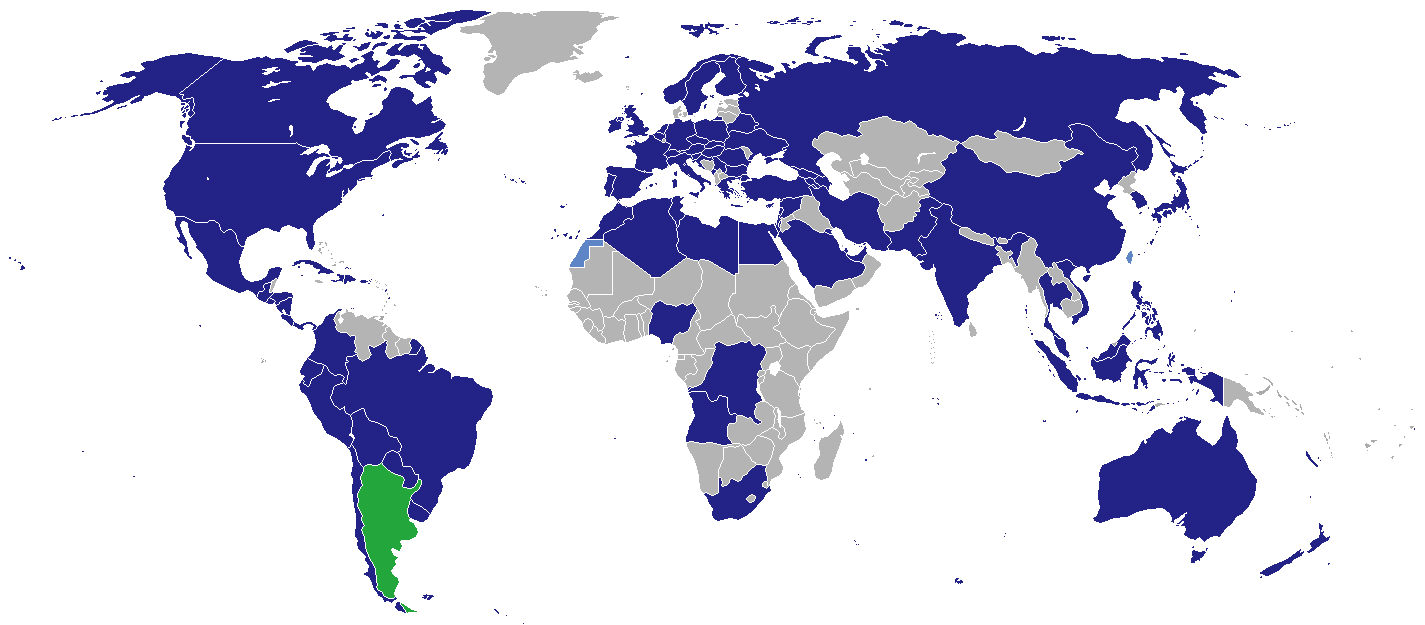
Diplomatic missions in Argentina

== Diplomatic missions in Buenos Aires ==
| Country | Mission type | Address | Photo | Website |
|---|---|---|---|---|
| Algeria | Embassy | Calle Montevideo 1889 | | |
| Angola | Embassy | Calle Virrey Loreto 2477 | | |
| Armenia | Embassy | Calle José Andrés Pacheco de Melo 1922 | | |
| Australia | Embassy | Calle Villanueva 1400 | | |
| Austria | Embassy | Calle French 3671 | | |
| Azerbaijan | Embassy | Maure 2151 | | |
| Belarus | Embassy | Paraguay 1178, 7th floor | | |
| Belgium | Embassy | Olga Cossettini 831, 3rd floor | | |
| Bolivia | Embassy | Avenida Corrientes 545, 2nd floor | | |
| Bolivia | Consulate-General | Virrey Cevallos 1379 | | |
| Brazil | Embassy | Cerrito 1350 | | |
| Brazil | Consulate-General | Carlos Pellegrini 1363, 5th floor | | |
| Bulgaria | Embassy | Sucre 1568 | | |
| Canada | Embassy | Tagle 2828 | | |
| Chile | Embassy | Tagle 2762 | | |
| Chile | Consulate-General | Avenida Diagonal Norte Avenida Pdte. Roque Saenz Peña 547, 2nd floor | | |
| China | Embassy | Crisólogo Larralde 5349 | | |
| Colombia | Embassy | Carlos Pellegrini 1363, 3rd floor | | |
| Colombia | Consulate-General | Carlos Pellegrini 1135, ground floor | | |
| Democratic Republic of the Congo | Embassy | Olleros 2067 | | |
| Costa Rica | Embassy | Avenida Córdoba 612 | | |
| Croatia | Embassy | Gorostiaga 2104 | | |
| Cuba | Embassy | Virrey del Pino 1810 | | |
| Cyprus | Embassy | Suipacha 844 | | |
| Czech Republic | Embassy | Junín 1461 | | |
| Denmark | Embassy | | | |
| Dominican Republic | Embassy | Santa Fe 911, 6-B | | |
| Ecuador | Embassy | Avenida Presidente Quintana 585, 9th floor | | |
| Ecuador | Consulate-General | Avenida Presidente Quintana 585, 10th floor | | |
| Egypt | Embassy | Virrey del Pino 3140 | | |
| El Salvador | Embassy | Avenida Santa Fe 1385, first floor | | |
| Finland | Embassy | Avenida Santa Fe 846, 5th floor | | |
| France | Embassy | Cerrito 1399 | | |
| France | Consulate-General | Basavilbaso 1253 | | |
| Georgia | Embassy | 14 de Julio 1656 | | |
| Germany | Embassy | Villanueva 1055 | | |
| Greece | Embassy | Mariscal Ramón Castilla 2952 | | |
| Guatemala | Embassy | Paraguay 610, 5th floor | | |
| Haiti | Embassy | Avenida Figueroa Alcorta 3297 | | |
| Holy See | Apostolic Nunciature | Avenida Alvear 1605 | | |
| Honduras | Embassy | Avenida Santa Fé 936, 6th floor | | |
| Hungary | Embassy | Suipacha 1111, 9th floor | | |
| India | Embassy | Torre Madero, Avenida Eduardo Madero 942, 19th Floor | | |
| Indonesia | Embassy | Mariscal Ramon Castilla 2901 | | |
| Iran | Embassy | Avenida Figueroa Alcorta 3229 | | |
| Ireland | Embassy | Edificio Bluesky, Avenida del Libertador 1068 | | |
| Israel | Embassy | Avenida de Mayo 701 | | |
| Italy | Embassy | Billinghurst 2577 | | |
| Italy | Consulate-General | Reconquista 572 | | |
| Japan | Embassy | Bouchard 547, 17th floor | | |
| Kuwait | Embassy | World Trade Center Building 1, Lola Mora 421, 12th & 13th floors | | |
| Lebanon | Embassy | Avenida del Libertador 2354 | | |
| Libya | Embassy | Virrey del Pino 3432 | | |
| Malaysia | Embassy | Villanueva 1040 | | |
| Mexico | Embassy | Arcos 1650 | | |
| Montenegro | Embassy | Libertad 1173, 1a | | |
| Morocco | Embassy | Castex 3461 | | |
| Netherlands | Embassy | Olga Cossettini 831, 3rd floor | | |
| New Zealand | Embassy | Carlos Pellegrini 1427, 5th Floor | | |
| Nicaragua | Embassy | Avendia Santa Fe 1845, 7th floor | | |
| Nigeria | Embassy | Juez Estrada 2746 | | |
| Norway | Embassy | Carlos Pellegrini 1427, 2nd floor | | |
| Pakistan | Embassy | Olleros 2143 | | |
| Palestine | Embassy | Riobamba 981 | | |
| Panama | Embassy | Avenida Santa Fe 1461, first floor | | |
| Paraguay | Embassy | Avenida Las Heras 2545 | | |
| Paraguay | Consulate-General | Viamonte 1851 | | |
| Peru | Embassy | Avenida Del Libertador 1720 | | |
| Peru | Consulate-General | San Martín 128-136 | | |
| Philippines | Embassy | 11 de Septiembre de 1888, 1011 | | |
| Poland | Embassy | Alejandro María de Aguado 2870 | | |
| Portugal | Embassy | Maipú 942, 17th floor | | |
| Qatar | Embassy | World Trade Center Building 1, Lora Mora 421 | | |
| Romania | Embassy | Calle Arroyo 962-970 | | |
| Russia | Embassy | Rodríguez Peña 1741 | | |
| San Marino | Embassy | Avenida Corrientes 3645, 5th floor | | |
| Saudi Arabia | Embassy | Alejandro María de Aguado 2881 | | |
| Serbia | Embassy | Montevideo 696, 1019 | | |
| Slovakia | Embassy | Avenida Pte. Figueroa Alcorta 3240 | | |
| Slovenia | Embassy | Esmeralda 910 | | |
| South Africa | Embassy | Marcelo T. de Alvear 590, 8th floor | | |
| South Korea | Embassy | Avenida del Libertador 2395 | | |
| Sovereign Military Order of Malta | Embassy | Avenida Callao 1685, 4th and 5th floors | | |
| Spain | Embassy | Avenida Presidente J. Figueroa Alcorta 3102 | | |
| Spain | Consulate-General | Calle Guido 1770 | | |
| Sweden | Embassy | Olga Cossettini 731, 2nd floor | | |
| Switzerland | Embassy | Avenida Santa Fe 846, 12th floor | | |
| Syria | Embassy | Avenida Callao 956 | | |
| Republic of China (Taiwan) | Taipei Representative Office | Avenida de Mayo 654, 4th floor | | |
| Thailand | Embassy | Vuelta de Obligado 1947, 12th floor | | |
| Tunisia | Embassy | Ciudad de la Paz 3086/88 | | |
| Turkey | Embassy | 11 de Septiembre, 1382 | | |
| Ukraine | Embassy | Olleros 2169 | | |
| United Arab Emirates | Embassy | Mariscal Antonio José de Sucre 3825 | | |
| United Kingdom | Embassy | Dr. Luis Agote 2412 | | |
| United States | Embassy | Avenida Colombia 4300 | | |
| Uruguay | Embassy | Arenales 1392 | | |
| Uruguay | Consulate-General | Arenales 1392 | | |
| Vietnam | Embassy | 11 de Septiembre, 1442 | | |

=== Delegations in Buenos Aires ===
| Country | Mission type | Address | Photo | Website |
|---|---|---|---|---|
| Basque Country | Delegation | Avenida Alicia Moreau de Justo 846, 3°, of. 21 | | |
| Catalonia | Delegation | Zabala 2034 | | |
| European Union | Delegation | Torre BankBoston, Avenida Eduardo Madero 1150 | | |

== Consular missions ==
=== Bahía Blanca ===
- Chile (Consulate)
- Italy (Consulate-General)
- Spain (Consulate-General)

=== Clorinda ===
- Paraguay (Consulate)

=== Comodoro Rivadavia ===
- Bolivia (Consulate)
- Chile (Consulate)

=== Colón ===
- Uruguay (Consulate)

=== Concordia ===
- Uruguay (Consulate)

=== Córdoba ===
- Bolivia (Consulate)
- Brazil (Consulate-General)
- Chile (Consulate-General)
- Italy (Consulate-General)
- Peru (Consulate-General)
- Spain (Consulate-General)
- Uruguay (Consulate-General)

=== Formosa ===
- Paraguay (Consulate)

=== Gualeguaychú ===
- Uruguay (Consulate)

=== Jujuy ===
- Bolivia (Consulate)

=== La Plata ===
- Italy (Consulate-General)
- Paraguay (Consulate)
- Peru (Consulate-General)
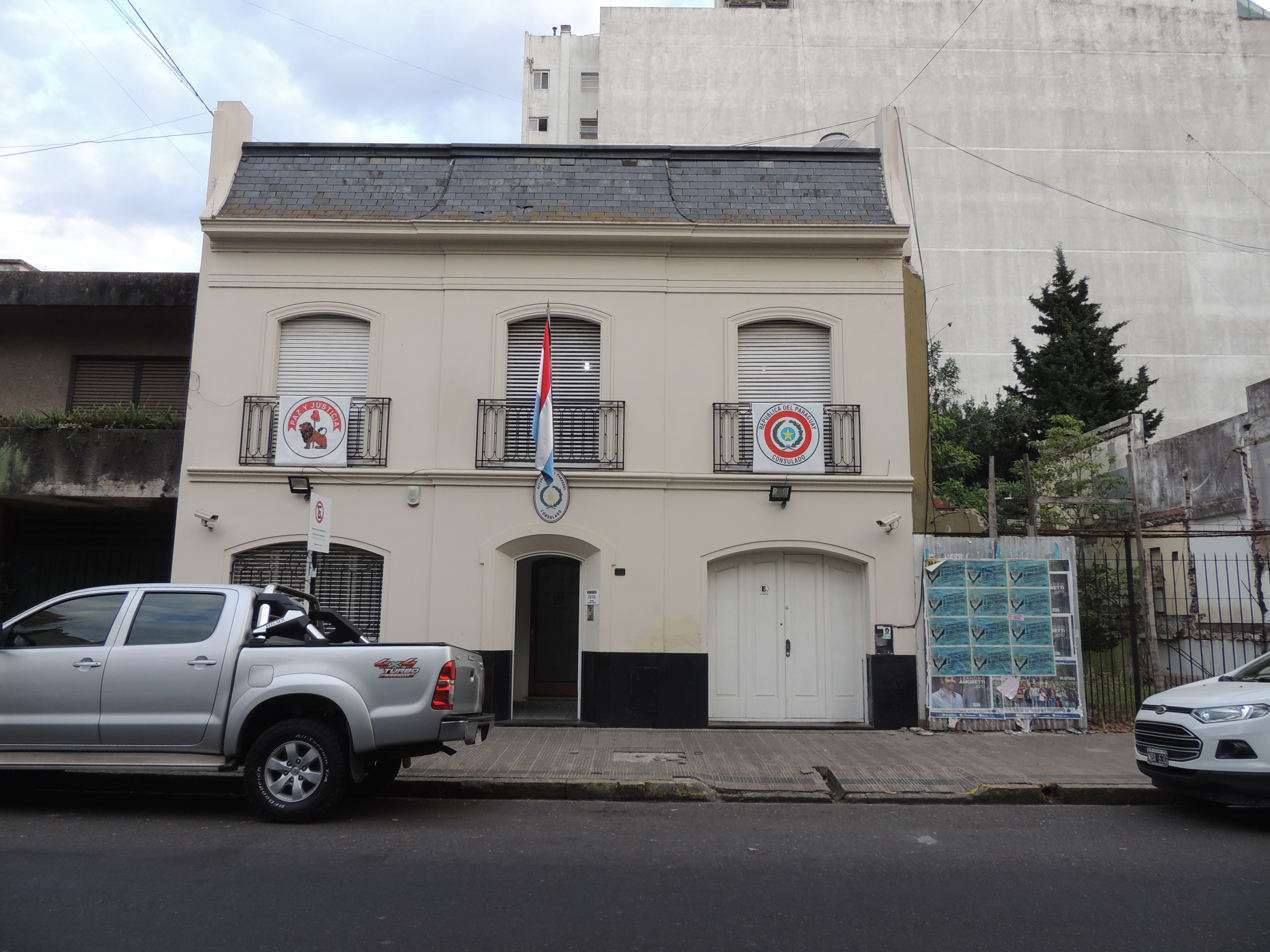
Paraguayan Consulate in La Plata

=== La Quiaca ===
- Bolivia (Consulate)

=== Lomas de Zamora ===
- Italy (Consular Agency)

=== Mar del Plata ===
- Chile (Consulate)
- Italy (Consulate)

=== Mendoza ===
- Bolivia (Consulate)
- Brazil (Consulate-General)
- Chile (Consulate-General)
- Italy (Consulate-General)
- Peru (Consulate-General)
- Spain (Consulate-General)
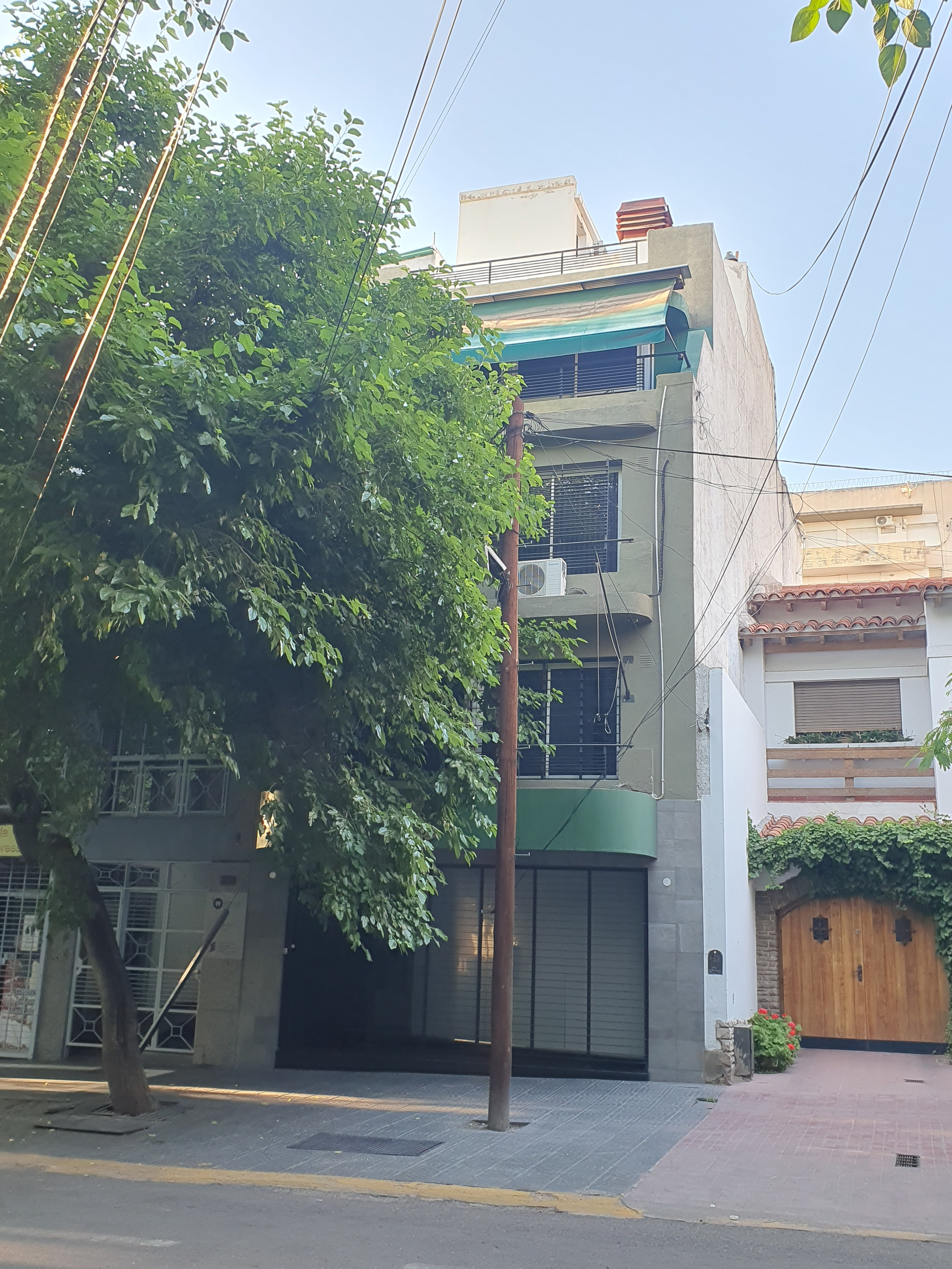
Consulate-General of Brazil

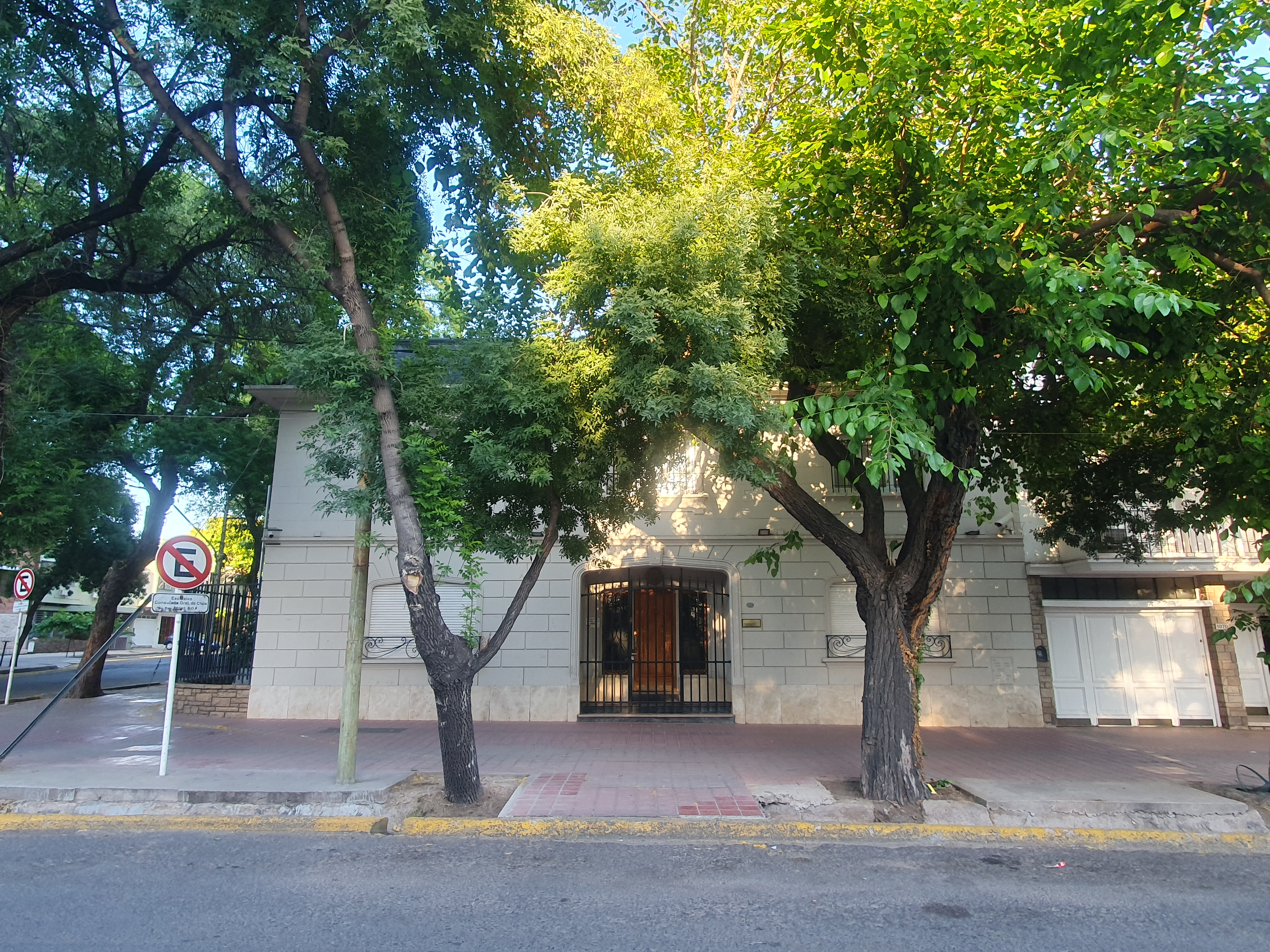
Consulate-General of Chile

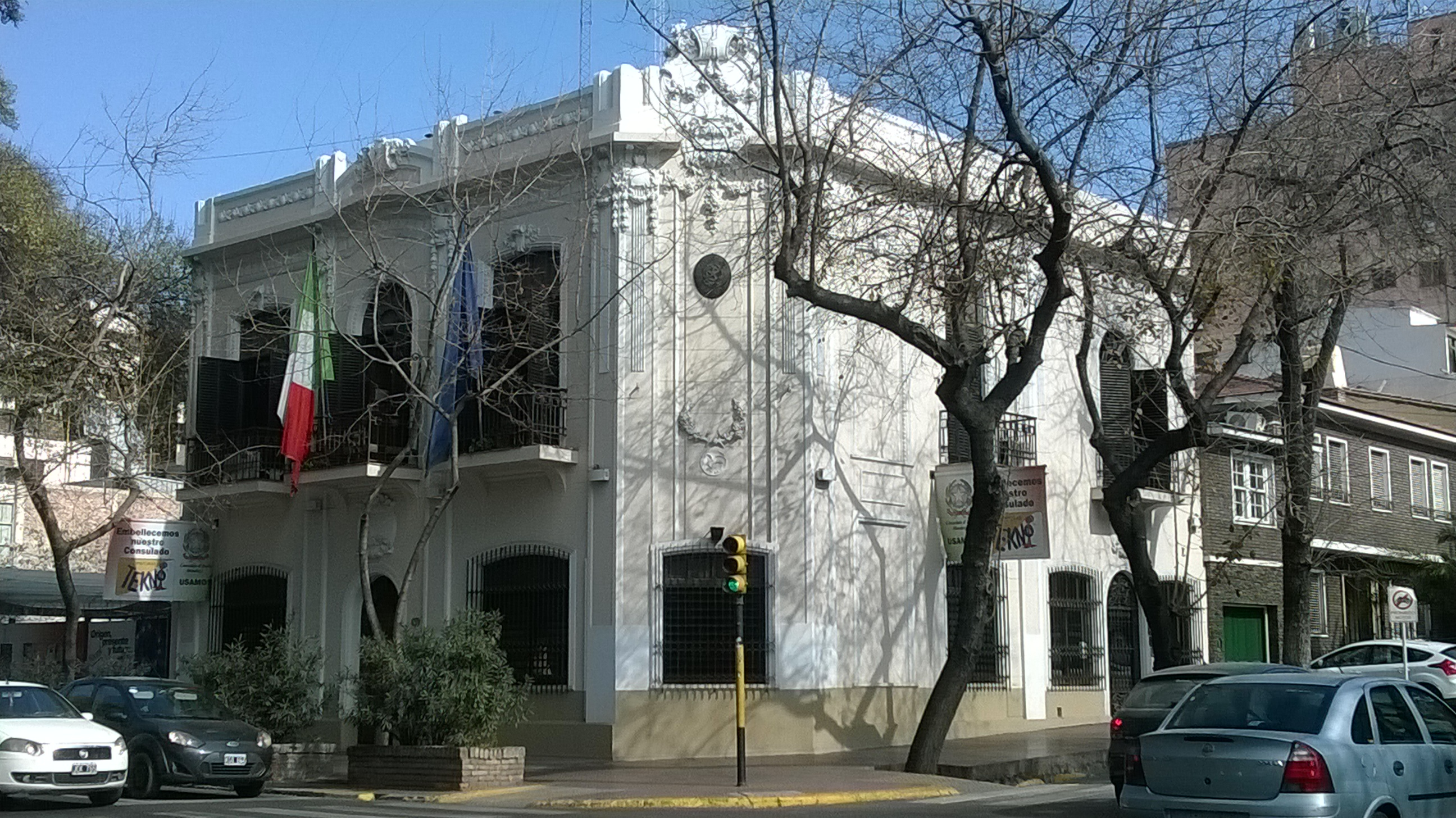
Consulate-General of Italy

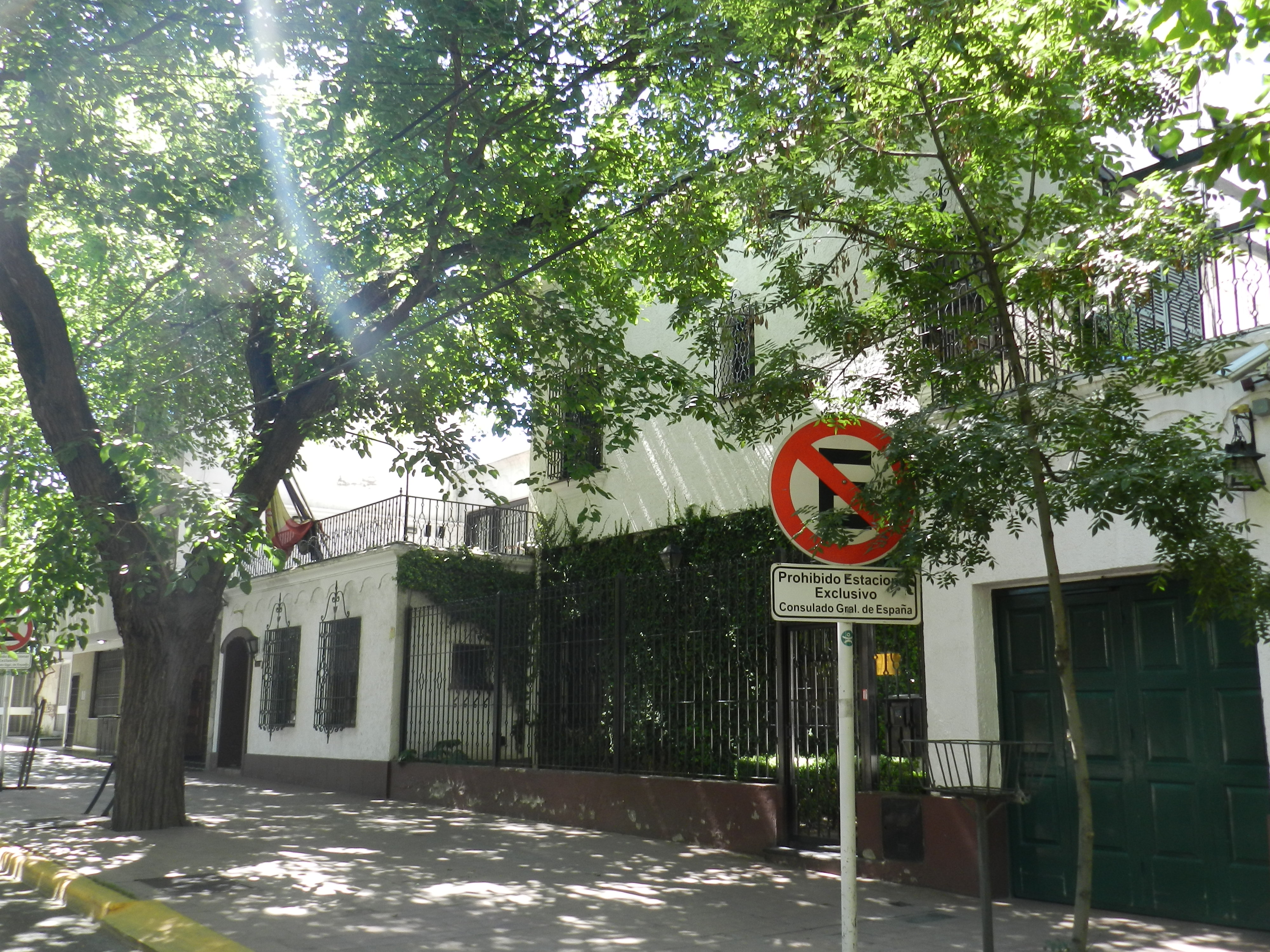
Consulate-General of Spain

=== Morón ===
- Italy (Consular Agency)

=== Neuquén ===
- Chile (Consulate-General)

=== Paso de los Libres ===
- Brazil (Consulate)

=== Posadas ===
- Paraguay (Consulate)

=== Puerto Iguazú ===
- Brazil (Consulate)
- Paraguay (Consulate)
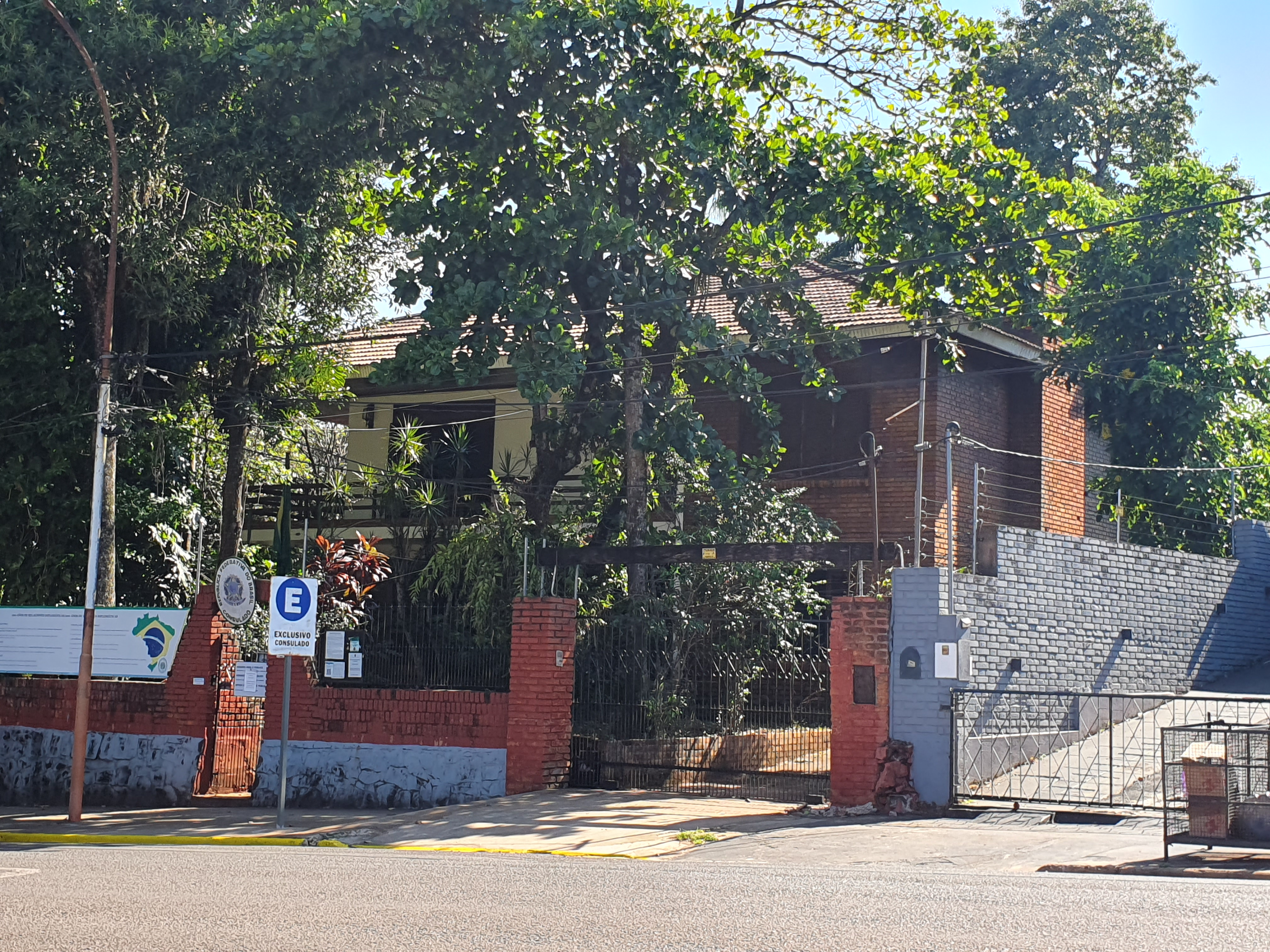
Consulate of Brazil

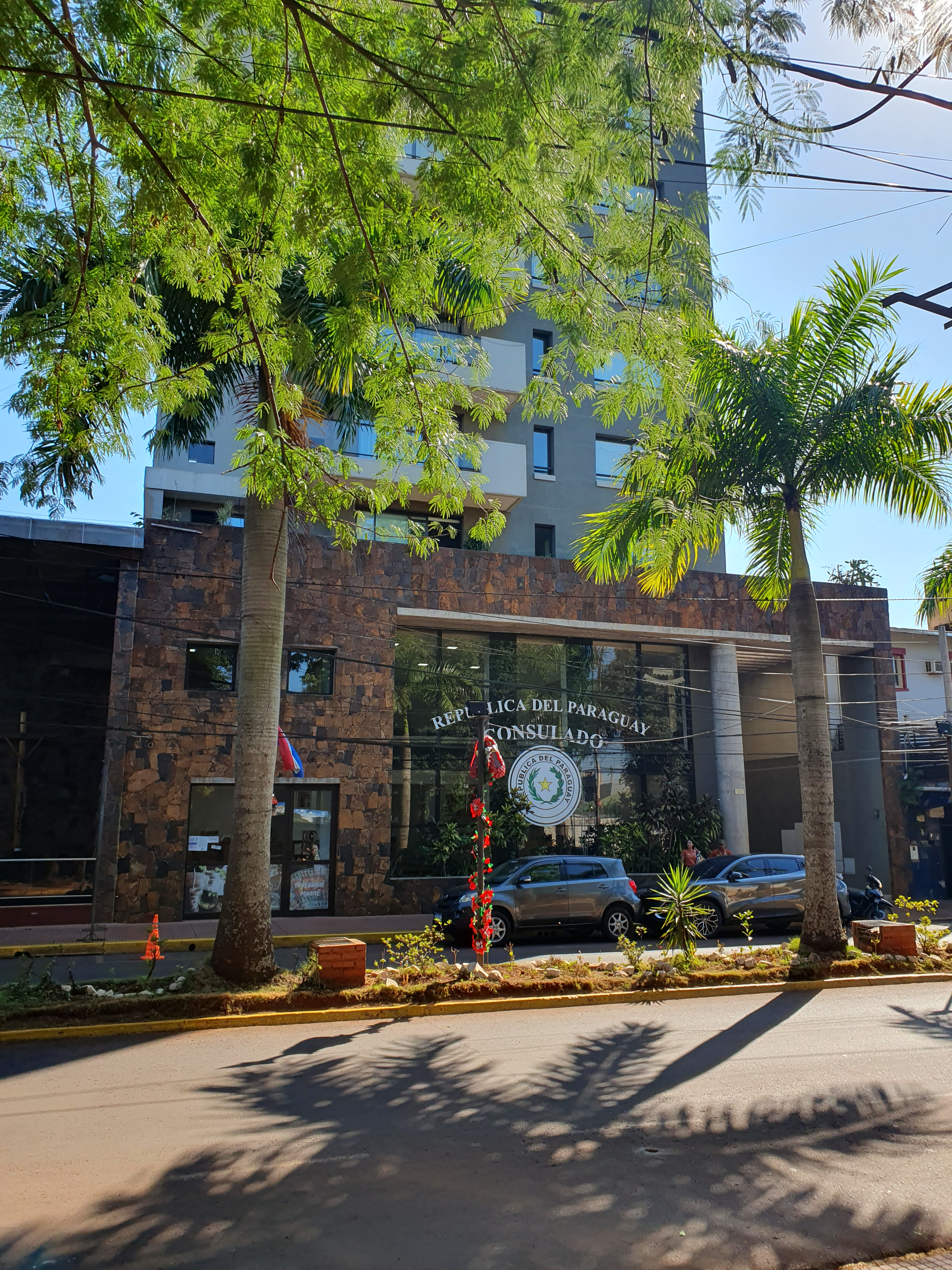
Consulate of Paraguay

=== Resistencia ===
- Paraguay (Consulate)

=== Río Gallegos ===
- Chile (Consulate-General)

=== Río Grande ===
- Chile (Consulate)

=== Rosario ===
- Bolivia (Consulate)
- Chile (Consulate-General)
- Italy (Consulate-General)
- Paraguay (Consulate)
- Spain (Consulate-General)
- Uruguay (Consulate-General)

=== Salta ===
- Bolivia (Consulate)
- Chile (Consulate-General)
- Paraguay (Consulate)

=== Salvador Mazza ===
- Bolivia (Consultate)

=== San Carlos de Bariloche ===
- Chile (Consulate-General)

=== San Justo ===
- Paraguay (Consulate)

=== San Ramón de la Nueva Orán ===
- Bolivia (Consulate)

=== Ushuaia ===
- Chile (Consulate)

=== Viedma ===
- Bolivia (Consulate)

== Non-resident embassies accredited to Argentina ==
=== Resident in Brasília, Brazil ===
- Bangladesh
- Barbados
- Botswana
- Cape Verde
- Cambodia
- Cameroon
- Ethiopia
- Gabon
- Ghana
- Ivory Coast
- Kenya
- Malawi
- Mauritania
- Mozambique
- Namibia
- North Korea
- Nepal
- Oman
- Republic of the Congo
- Senegal
- Singapore
- Sri Lanka
- Sudan
- Tanzania
- Timor-Leste
- Zambia
- Zimbabwe

=== Resident in Washington, D.C., United States ===
- Eswatini
- Lesotho
- Madagascar
- Rwanda
- South Sudan
- Uganda

=== Resident in other cities ===
- Afghanistan (Ottawa)
- Belize (Mexico City)
- Brunei (Ottawa)
- Djibouti (Havana)
- Iceland (Madrid)
- Jamaica (Bogotá)
- Laos (Havana)
- Lithuania (Madrid)
- Seychelles (New York City)

== Missions to be open ==
=== Buenos Aires ===
- Bangladesh - Embassy

== Closed missions ==
| Host city | Sending country | Mission | Year closed | Ref. |
|---|---|---|---|---|
| Buenos Aires | Albania | Embassy | 2014 | |
| Buenos Aires | Bangladesh | Embassy | 1978 | |
| Buenos Aires | Bosnia and Herzegovina | Embassy | 2007 | |
| Buenos Aires | East Germany | Embassy | 1990 (Note: Existed as a commercial mission in between 1954 and 1962, opened as an embassy in 1973.) | |
| Buenos Aires | Gabon | Embassy | | |
| Buenos Aires | Iraq | Embassy | 1993 | |
| Buenos Aires | Ivory Coast | Embassy | | |
| Buenos Aires | Lithuania | Embassy | 2012 | |
| Buenos Aires | North Korea | Embassy | 1977 | |
| Buenos Aires | Republic of China | Embassy (Note: Now continues as Taipei Commercial and Cultural Office in Argentina) | 1972 | |
| Buenos Aires | Venezuela | Embassy | 2024 | |
| Córdoba | Paraguay | Consulate | 2024 | |
| Corrientes | Paraguay | Consulate | 2024 | |
| Mendoza | Paraguay | Consulate | 2024 | |
| Neuquén | Paraguay | Consulate | 2024 | |
| Paraná | Uruguay | Consulate-General | 2020 | |

== See also ==
- Foreign relations of Argentina
- List of diplomatic missions of Argentina
- Visa requirements for Argentine citizens
