= New Zealand–Samoa relations =

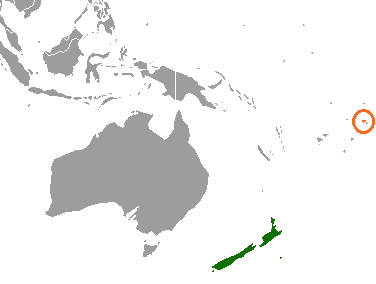

- New Zealand: Samoa

New Zealand and Samoa have had close relations based on a treaty of friendship between the two countries since Samoa became independent in 1962. New Zealand administered Samoa under a League of Nations mandate then a United Nations trusteeship from 1920 to 1961. Both nations are members of the Commonwealth of Nations and the Pacific Islands Forum.

== History ==
=== New Zealand occupation of Samoa ===
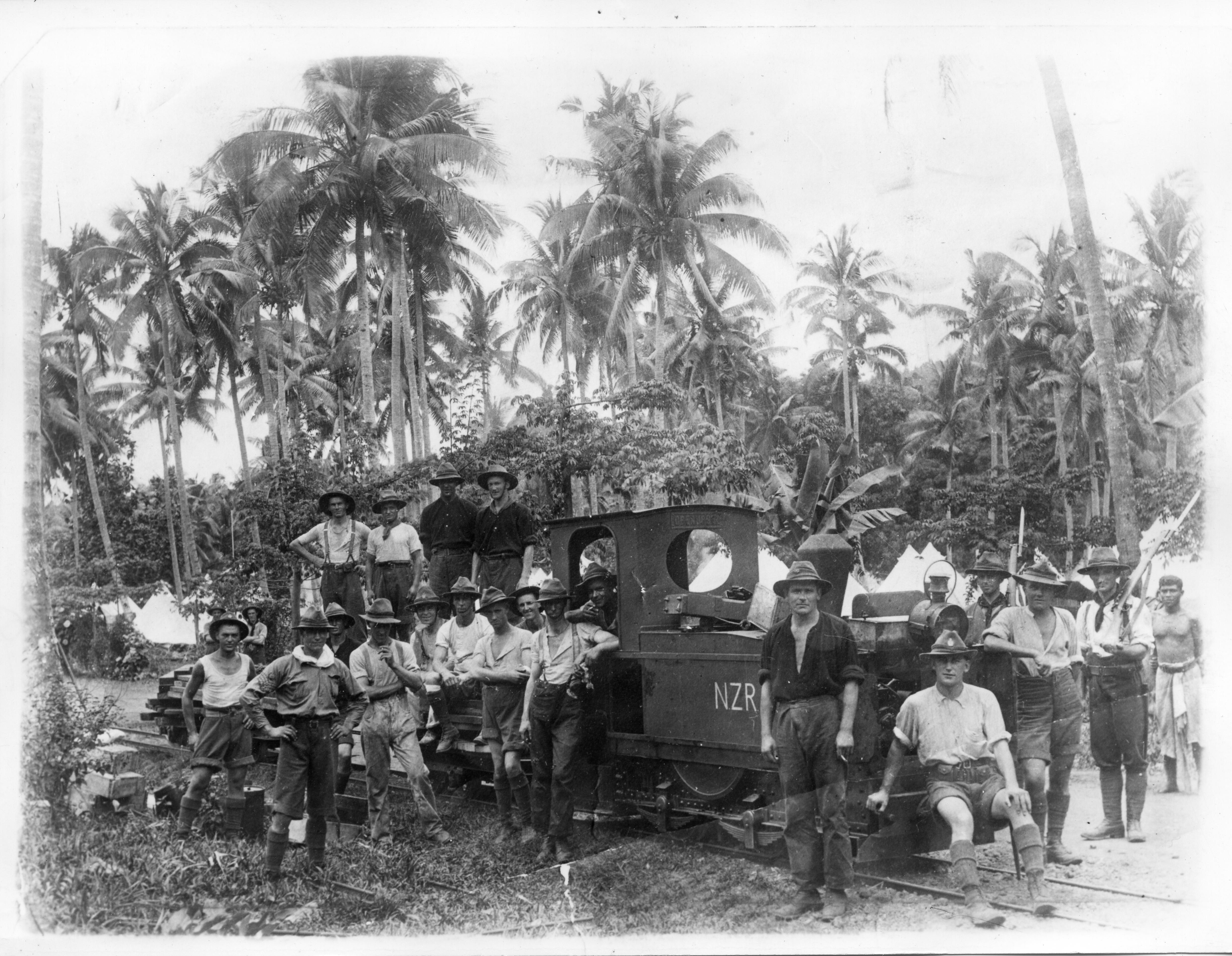
New Zealand soldiers in Samoa, 1914

Initial contact between the people of New Zealand and Samoa began in the 1800s with the arrival of missionaries from the London Missionary Society who travelled to New Zealand and then to Samoa proselytising. In December 1899, Western Samoa (comprising the islands of Upolu and Savai'i) became a German protectorate and was known as German Samoa (Eastern Samoa was administered by the United States). In August 1914, during World War I, an expeditionary force from New Zealand took control of German Samoa unopposed. In 1919, the League of Nations granted New Zealand mandate to administer Western Samoa under a League of Nation mandate. Between 1918 and 1919, inhabitants of Western Samoa became infected by a pneumonic influenza which killed 8,500 residents (approx. 22% of the total population). This influenza led to increased desire for Samoans to obtain their independence.

=== Nationalism and independence ===
The Mau movement began with a non-violent protest movement that was led by the chiefs of Savaii who were also known as Pule. The Mau a Pule is the original Mau for Samoan independence. This Mau was led by the Chief from Safotulafai, Faasaleleaga on the big island of Savaii, Lauaki Namulauulu Mamoe. The Mau a Pule resulted in German governor Solf ordering the exile of the chiefs of Pule who all supported the Mau movement to Saipan. The leaders of the Mau a Pule agreed to be taken to Saipan in order to avoid bloodshed. After Germany lost World War I, the chiefs of Pule who were in Saipan were returned to Samoa. On the way home, Lauaki Namulauulu Mamoe died en route and was buried in Tarawa. His bones were later returned to Savaii where they now rest in Fogapoa.

By 1929, the Mau movement became well known in Western Samoa an increased their efforts for Samoan independence, led by Tupua Tamasese Lealofi III. On 28 December 1929, a peaceful demonstration assembled in the capital Apia. Soon afterwards, some of the demonstrators began to throw stones at the police nearby. At that moment, the police began to fire at the demonstrators killing 11 people, including Tupua Tamasese Lealofi. One police officer was also killed in the violence. The day was to be known as Black Saturday.

In 1936, the Mau was recognised as a legitimate political organisation. They soon held majorities in both a newly elected Fono of Faipule and the legislative assembly. Independence for Western Samoa was delayed due to the Great Depression and World War II. After the Second World War, the newly created United Nations led efforts in New Zealand to grant Samoa independence as part of the decolonization process. On 1 January 1962, Samoa obtained its independence from New Zealand, the first Pacific island country to achieve independence. The Samoan independence celebration was attended by New Zealand Prime Minister Keith Holyoake.

=== Treaty of Friendship ===
In August 1962, a Treaty of Friendship (Feagaiga o Uō in Samoan) was signed between both nations. The treaty contains seven articles which are as follows:

Article I: Relations between New Zealand and Western Samoa shall continue to be governed by a spirit of close friendship.

Article II: Where appropriate the two Governments shall consult each other on matters of mutual interest and concern.

Article III: Each Government shall ensure that citizens of the other living within its territory are, in accordance with the normal practice between friendly states, given equitable treatment and full legal protection and access to the Courts.

Article IV: The two Governments shall continue to work together to promote the welfare of the people of Western Samoa. In particular the Government of New Zealand will consider sympathetically requests from the Government of Western Samoa for technical, administrative and other assistance. In particular the Government of New Zealand will:

- (a) When requested, act as the channel for communications between the Government of Western Samoa and other Governments and international organisations;
- (b) When requested, and where permissible and appropriate, undertake the representation of the Government of Western Samoa at any international conference at which Western Samoa is entitled to be represented;
- (c) When requested, supply Western Samoa with information concerning international affairs;
- (d) Undertake the diplomatic protection of nationals of Western Samoa in other countries and perform consular functions on their behalf.

Article V: The Government of New Zealand shall, for as long as the Government of Western Samoa wishes, and in such manner as will in no way impair the right of the Government of Western Samoa to formulate its own foreign policies, afford assistance to the Government of Western Samoa in the conduct of its international relations.

Article VI: Either Government may at any time give to the other Government written notice of its desire to terminate the Agreement. In such case, the Agreement shall terminate upon the expiration of three months from the date on which the notice is received.

Article VII: The Agreement shall enter into force on the date of signature.

=== Citizenship status of Samoan subjects ===
In 1982, the Privy Council granted citizenship to Western Samoan citizens born since 1924 when the nation was under New Zealand mandate. However, the New Zealand government did not accept the decision and instead granted New Zealand citizenship to Samoan citizens who were living in New Zealand on 14 September 1982. This occurred when a Samoan woman by the name of Falema‘i Lesa overstayed her visa in New Zealand and pressed her claim to be a New Zealand citizen. The Privy Council ruled that all Western Samoans born between 1924 and 1948 were British subjects and that in 1949 they and their descendants had become New Zealand citizens.

In response, the Third National Government led by Prime Minister Robert Muldoon abolished that right by passing the Western Samoa Citizenship Act 1982, which effectively overturned the Privy Council's ruling. This ruling was upheld by successive New Zealand governments until November 2024. On 20 November 2024, the New Zealand Parliament passed legislation restoring the right to New Zealand citizenship for individuals born in Samoa between 1924 and 1949.

=== 2024 HMNZS Manawanui sinking ===
On 5 October 2024, the Royal New Zealand Navy ship HMNZS Manawanui ran aground and sunk off the coast of Siumu on the southern coast of Samoa's Upolu island. The Manawanui had been surveying a nearby reef and was caught up in a storm. The sinking of the Manawanui polluted the surrounding sea and disrupted the livelihoods of local communities in the Safata district, who were unable to fish due to restrictions around the wreckage site.

On 15 October 2024, New Zealand Prime Minister Christopher Luxon formally apologised to the Samoan Prime Minister Fiamē Naomi Mataʻafa and acting prime minister for the sinking of Manawanui. The New Zealand Defence Force (NZDF) also launched salvage operation called Operation Resolution with the support of the Samoan government, Maritime New Zealand and Samoa's Maritime Pollution Advisory Committee (MPAC). By 23 October, the NZDF, Samoan authorities and local contractor Ark Marine had removed three containers from a nearby reef. By 25 January 2025, the Samoan and New Zealand governments were discussing compensation over the Manawanui sinking at the request of affected communities. By 7 February 2025, salvage teams had removed two cycles of fuel from the sunken ship. On the 6th of October, the New Zealand government paid Samoa $6 million NZD as compensation for the accident.

== Bilateral visits and contacts ==
There have been numerous official visits between leaders of both nations. In 2002, New Zealand Prime Minister Helen Clark came to Samoa and officially apologised for New Zealand's treatment of Samoans during colonial times.

In March 2018 New Zealand Prime Minister Jacinda Ardern and Foreign Minister Winston Peters led a Pacific Mission to Samoa. While in Samoa the Prime Minister met with the Samoan Prime Minister, other ministers and attended a number of climate change and disaster resilience related events. In May 2019, Samoan Deputy Prime Minister Fiamē Naomi Mataʻafa visited New Zealand to attend and speak at the Just Transition Summit in New Plymouth and met with Prime Minister Ardern, Foreign Minister Peters, Minister Shaw, Minister Genter and members of the Pacific Caucus.

In mid-June 2022, Samoan Prime Minister Fiamē visited New Zealand to affirm bilateral relations and cooperation in the areas of climate change, COVID-19 and regional cooperation through the Pacific Islands Forum. Since Samoa had recently signed several bilateral economic and cultural agreements with China, Fiamē sought to reassure her New Zealand counterparts that Samoa was not seeking to pursue military cooperation with China. Fiamē also visited Samoan seasonal horticultural workers in the Hawke's Bay region during her New Zealand visit.

In early August 2022, Fiamē hosted a New Zealand delegation led by Ardern. During the trip, the two leaders discussed issues of concern to New Zealand–Samoan relations including climate change, economic resilience, COVID-19, health and Samoan seasonal workers. During the meeting, Ardern confirmed that New Zealand would contribute NZ$15 million in aid to support Samoa's climate change mitigation efforts and NZ$12m to rebuild Apia's historical Savalalo Market, which had been destroyed by a fire.

In mid March 2026, New Zealand Prime Minister Christopher Luxon led a parliamentary delegation consisting of Minister for Pacific Peoples Shane Reti, Police Minister Mark Mitchell, Tim van de Molen, Jenny Salesa and Teanau Tuiono to Samoa to reaffirm bilateral relations with those countries. Prior to the trip, Luxon's office disputed Samoan Prime Minister Laʻauli Leuatea Schmidt's claim that Luxon had requested a chiefly matai title through the New Zealand High Commissioner. On 16 March, the Samoan government subsequently clarified that Luxon had not requested the matai title and that granting the title was done at their prerogative. The following day, Luxon and La'auli signed memorandums of understanding to strengthen bilateral police and customs cooperation against drug smuggling.

== Migration ==
The 1874 New Zealand census recorded 6 Samoans in New Zealand. Numbers have increased steadily ever since, to 279 in 1936, 1,336 in 1951, 19,711 in 1976, 24,141 in 1981, and 47,118 in 2001.

There were 182,721 people identifying as being part of the Samoan ethnic group at the 2018 New Zealand census, making up 3.9% of New Zealand's population. This is an increase of 38,583 people (26.8%) since the 2013 census, and an increase of 51,618 people (39.4%) since the 2006 census. Some of the increase between the 2013 and 2018 census was due to Statistics New Zealand adding ethnicity data from other sources (previous censuses, administrative data, and imputation) to the 2018 census data to reduce the number of non-responses.

New Zealand is home to the second largest Samoan community outside of Samoa (after the United States).

== Trade and aid relations ==
In 2011, the Samoan government launched the New Zealand Samoa Trade and Investment Commission to facilitate and increase the flow of trade between both nations.

In 2015, New Zealand provided $27 million NZ dollars to Samoa. Much of New Zealand's aid to Samoa is to assist the tourism, energy, education, law and justice, and health programs.

In 2018, trade between New Zealand and Samoa totaled NZ$401 million. New Zealand exports to Samoa include: machinery and equipment; wood and articles of wood; industrial supplies; and foodstuffs. Samoan exports to New Zealand include: edible vegetables; beverages; edible fruits and nuts.

New Zealand and Samoa ratified the PACER Plus agreement, which came into force on 13 December 2020.

There are direct flights between both nations through the following airlines: Air New Zealand and Samoa Airways.

== Defence and security cooperation ==
Samoa currently does not maintain its own military forces. New Zealand regularly patrols Samoan waters and airspace with the permission of the Samoan government.

On 17 March 2026, New Zealand and Samoa signed two memorandums of understanding to strengthen bilateral police and customs cooperation against drug smuggling in the region.

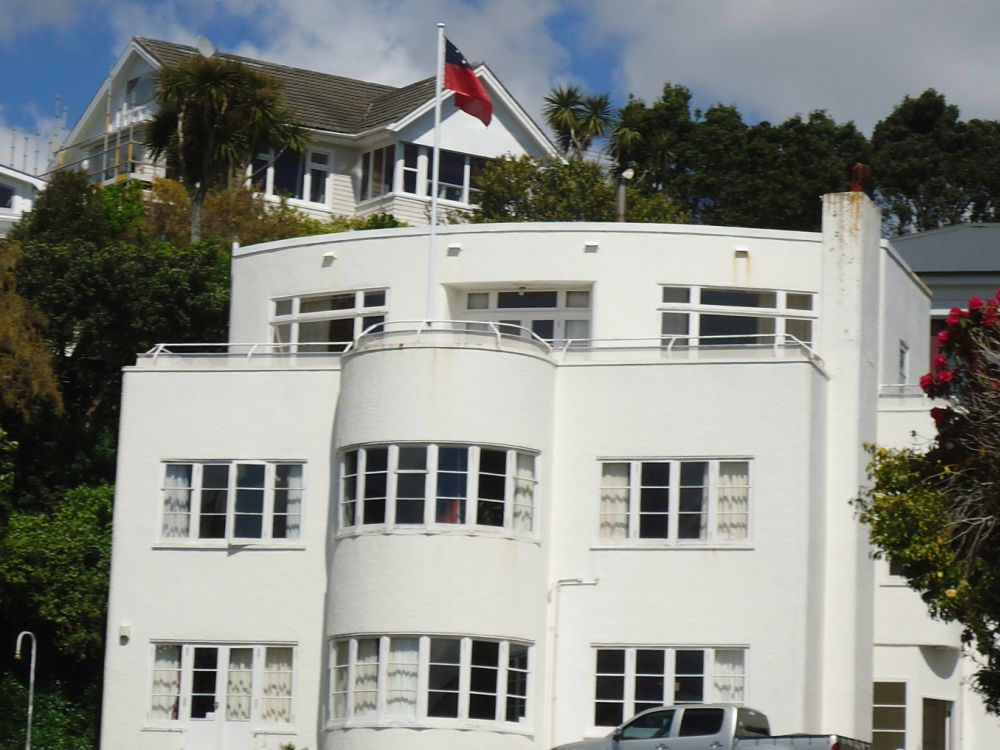
Samoan High Commission in Wellington

== Resident diplomatic missions ==
- New Zealand has a high commission in Apia.
- Samoa has a high commission in Wellington and a consulate-general in Auckland.

== See also ==
- List of colonial governors of Samoa
- List of high commissioners of New Zealand to Samoa
- Samoan New Zealanders

== Bibliography ==
- Belgrave, Michael (2024). Becoming Aotearoa: A New History of New Zealand. Auckland: Massey University Press. ISBN 9780995131866.
