= The Tohora Oranga Bill =

The Tohorā Oranga Bill is a Member's Bill, which is a bill introduced by a member in New Zealand's Parliament who is not a minister, introduced in 2026 in New Zealand by Green Party Member Teanau Tuiono. The bill, submitted on 5 February 2026, aims to grant whales legal personhood and natural rights. The bill's language and philosophy is based on He Whakaputanga Moana Declaration of 2024, which was signed by Indigenous leaders of New Zealand, the Cook Islands, Tahiti, Tonga, Hawaii, and Easter Island.

== Bill language and background ==
The Tohorā Oranga Bill presents five principles for the inherent/natural rights of whales: (1) freedom of movement and migration, (2) protection of natural behaviors, (3) protection of social and cultural structures, (4) the right to a healthy environment, and (5) the right to restoration and regeneration of habitats.

1. Freedom of movement and migration can be defined as "...[the] right to move and migrate freely within their established distribution and migratory routes, and all care must be taken to conserve and respect areas and migratory routes used by whales."
2. Protection of natural behaviors can be defined as "... [the] right to engage in their natural behaviors freely and protected from harm."
3. Protection of social and cultural structures can be defined as "... [the] right to have their unique and complex social and cultural structures and behaviors protected."
4. The right to a healthy environment can be defined as "...[the] right to thrive in a healthy and balanced ecosystem."
5. The right to restoration and regeneration of habitats can be defined as "...[the] right to the restoration and regeneration of their habitats and ecosystems."

Precedent for the Tohorā Oranga Bill

New Zealand has a history of using the legal personhood approach to expanding animal rights and environmentalism from Parliament.

- Te Urewera Act, 2014: New Zealand declared that Te Urewera a legal person, removing it from New Zealand Crown ownership and revoking its national park designation as, due to legal person status, the land cannot be owned.
- Te Awa Tupua (Whanganui River Claims Settlement) Act, 2017: On March 20, 2017, New Zealand's parliament declared the Whanganui River a legal person.
- Taranaki Maunga, 2025: New Zealand's parliament unanimously voted to declare the Taranaki Maunga mountains a legal person.

== He Whakaputanga Moana Declaration of 2024 ==
He Whakaputanga Moana Declaration (Declaration for the Ocean) is a declaration signed on March 28, 2024, which officially recognizes whales as legal persons with natural rights. The Declaration is based on Māori belief systems and values, where whales are ancestors and sentient creatures. The Declaration cites various threats to whales from humans, including whaling and pollution, as a danger to the survival of whales and the oceans in general, calling for immediate action to reduce these dangers. The inherent/natural rights recognized by the Declaration are:

1. Freedom of movement
2. The right to a healthy environment
3. The right to thrive.

The Declaration is not legally binding nor an international treaty, but is an avenue to creating more protections for whales. The Declaration is based on the principles of kaitiakitanga, whanaungatanga, manaakitanga, rangatiratanga, taup and rāhui, and whakapapa. In the Declaration, these principles are described as:

1. Kaitiakitanga: embracing guardianship and responsibility for the ocean's health
2. Whanaungatanga: recognizing the interconnectedness of all things, and recognizing the ocean's health as a part of community wellbeing
3. Manaakitanga: honoring the ocean and creatures within based on their inherent value
4. Rangatiratanga: to achieve self determination, protecting the oceans using indigenous knowledge and treating the waters with dignity is fundamental
5. Tapu and Rāhui: the necessity to install temporary restrictions if it means the ocean can continue on into future generations
6. Whakapapa: recognizing the connection to the ocean and honoring previous indigenous ancestors by using their knowledge in preservation

The Declaration contains twelve parts, which are:

1. "Recognition of whale personhood"
2. "Whale personhood and rights"
3. "Holistic whale protection"
4. "Community empowerment and collaboration"
5. "Whale protection fund"
6. "Implementation and monitoring"
7. "Cultural values and spiritual connection"
8. "Future generations and intergenerational equity"
9. "Education and public awareness"
10. "Global leadership and responsibility"
11. "Continuous improvement and future generations
12. "Closing statement"/"Adoption and implementation"

Animal rights groups regard the Declaration to be a step toward interspecies justice by extending legal personhood to non-human animals, expanding the scope of consideration of interests. Interspecies justice is another term for multispecies justice, which was defined by The University of Sydney Professor Danielle Celermajer as "...a theory of justice that includes not only the interests of all humans but of the nonhuman, such as other animals, plants, forests, rivers and ecological systems."

== Indigenous Influence ==
The Tohorā Oranga Bill is largely based in Māori belief systems and values, where whales hold a unique sacred significance.

=== Taonga Species ===
In Māori cultures, a taonga is something that is treasured or sacred, and the Māori are responsible for acting as guardians to anything taonga. Whales are an example of a Taonga Species, which are species of animals that were present in New Zealand before the first contact of Europeans with the Māori. As a Taonga Species, whales hold unique treasured status to the Māori, with traditional Māori mythology portraying whales as supernatural beings and descendants of the God of the oceans, Tangaroa. Based on this significance, the Tohorā Oranga Bill is meant to protect the species from ecological damage and treatment by humans contrary to their taonga status, including environmental degradation and destruction, restrictions on the whales' behaviors, and a legal status as more than a resource.

=== Mana ===
For Teanau Tuiono, he considers whales to be sacred ancestors who possess mana, or a spiritual and powerful life-force. For the Māori, the Manaakitanga Principle is the principle of being kind and respecting the mana (dignity) of others in a relational, mutual way. Similar to this principle, the bill, according to Tuiono, is meant to recognize and protect the mana of whales in a legal context. The grounding of the bill in Māori values means the bill is based on relationships and the significance of whales as an approach to conservation rather than the standard utilitarian approach to conservation and preservation. The utilitarian approach to conservation and preservation means the emphasis is on preservation via harm reduction, specifically harm reduction for humans, as animals and ecosystems are used as resources. The approach of the bill, based in the preservation of the mana of whales, focuses on the value of nature from an ethical, aesthetic, and/or spiritual standpoint.

== Legal Personhood for Non-Humans ==
Legal personhood is an approach to animal rights which aims to change the status of animals from "commodity" to legal persons. Supporters of the legal personhood approach believe that the property status of animals poses a fundamental problem for achieving animal liberation, and this status must be changed to move the animal rights movement forward. This approach has been used in a variety of places with varying success. In some judicial cases, animal rights advocates will use habeas corpus as the legal precedent for achieving legal personhood, however some judges have shown to be hesitant to extend legal personhood to non-human animals on the basis of cognitive ability differences between human and non-human species. Detractors of this approach raise concerns with feasibility, citing the unlikeliness of convincing legislative bodies to grant legal personhood for non-human animals considering the scope of capital that is invested in institutions that would be challenged by non-human animal legal personhood legislation, such as the farming and zoo industries. Some detractors also argue that the focus of the animal rights movement should be on increasing the responsibilities humans have toward non-human animals rather than restructuring a legal system to include non-human animals as legal persons.
