= Falemaʻi Lesa =

Samoan national resident in New Zealand

Falemaʻi Lesa (born 1946) is a Samoan citizen resident in New Zealand who famously and successfully stopped her own deportation by arguing she was also a New Zealand citizen to the Judicial Committee of the Privy Council, then the highest court of appeal in New Zealand.

== Background ==
Lesa was born in Samoa. She moved to New Zealand on 25 September 1975 on a temporary visa. In 1976, she was arrested in part of the dawn raids while working as a kitchen hand in Wellington.

Instead of accepting deportation, she and her lawyers fought back. She first applied for a New Zealand citizenship certificate, which was denied. Her lawyers knew they would likely lose in the New Zealand courts and they had to take it to the Privy Council to have any chance of winning. They filed a case in the High Court and requested the case to be removed to the Court of Appeal to expedite the process. As expected, the Court of Appeal ruled against her. She then appealed to the Privy Council.

== Lesa v Attorney-General of New Zealand ==
It's marvellous, and I am so happy.

— Falemaʻi Lesa, On hearing about her victory at the Privy Council

Her case Lesa v Attorney-General of New Zealand, is a key legal case and had considerable impact on Samoans and New Zealand Law. The Privy Council ruled in July 1982 that all Western Samoans born between 1924 and 1948 were British subjects, and that under the British Nationality and New Zealand Citizenship Act 1948 from 1 January 1949 they and their descendants had become New Zealand citizens.

One of the results of this ruling was the controversial decision by the Muldoon National government to pass the New Zealand Citizenship and Western Samoa Act 1982 which effectively rescinded and annulled any citizenship claims by Samoans living in Samoa in retrospect. Only Samoans who can prove they were in New Zealand on 14 September 1982 are eligible for New Zealand citizenship. Lesa herself was specifically excluded in the Act and can keep her New Zealand citizenship.

Her barristers were George Rosenberg and Dr. George Paterson Barton, Q.C., from Wellington, who both acted in a number of prominent cases affecting Samoans.

The case continues to generate controversy and spur efforts to amend the immigration and nationality laws in New Zealand.

== Aftermath ==
In 2002, Barton, Lesa's lawyer in the case, presented a petition with 100,000 signatures to Parliament, asking for the law to be overturned and the Privy Council judgment to be restored. Parliament's Petitions Committee rejected the request, but acknowledged there was still a lingering sense of grievance from Samoan towards the New Zealand government for its act during and after the colonial rule. The committee suggested the government try to improve NZ-Samoa relationships in other ways.

In 2021, Lesa was in attendance when Prime Minister Jacinda Ardern apologized for racist immigration policies of past governments. Lesa performed fa’amāgaloga, an act of forgiving, on Ardern.

In 2024, Green MP Teanau Tuiono introduced a private member's bill to restore NZ citizenship to Samoans born between 1924 and 1948. There were an estimated 5,000 such people still alive. The bill was passed as the Citizenship (Western Samoa) (Restoration) Amendment Act 2024.

== Personal History ==
Lesa never publicly spoke about the case again until 2022, when she worked on an oral history project with filmmaker Jade Jackson.

== See also ==
- Third National Government of New Zealand
- New Zealand nationality law
