= Citizenship (Western Samoa) (Restoration) Amendment Act 2024 =

Proposed Act of Parliament in New Zealand

New Zealand Parliament
- Royal assent: 25 November 2024

Legislative history
- Introduced by: Teanau Tuiono
- Committee responsible: Governance and Administration Committee
- First reading: 10 April 2024
- Second reading: 25 October 2024
- Third reading: 20 November 2024

Related legislation
- Citizenship Act 1977, Citizenship Regulations 2002, Citizenship (Western Samoa) Act 1982
- Status: Current legislation

The Citizenship (Western Samoa) (Restoration) Amendment Act 2024 is a New Zealand Act of Parliament that "provides entitlement to New Zealand citizenship for a group of people born in Western Samoa whose citizenship was removed through the enactment of the Citizenship (Western Samoa) Act 1982. The bill was introduced by Green Party of Aotearoa New Zealand Member of Parliament Teanau Tuiono. It passed its first reading on 10 April 2024 with the support of all parliamenatary parties except the governing National Party. Following amendments at the select committee stage, the bill passed its second and third readings with unanimous support from all parties. It received royal assent on 25 November 2024.

== Background ==
In 1982, following a lawsuit brought by Falemaʻi Lesa, the Judicial Committee of the Privy Council ruled that because individuals born in Western Samoa when it was a New Zealand League of Nations mandate territory were treated by New Zealand law as "natural-born British subjects," they were entitled to New Zealand citizenship when it was first created in 1948. In response, the Third National Government led by Prime Minister Robert Muldoon abolished that right by passing the Western Samoa Citizenship Act 1982, which effectively overturned the Privy Council's ruling. This ruling was upheld by successive New Zealand governments.

== Provisions ==
The Citizenship (Western Samoa) (Restoration) Amendment Act 2024 proposes restoring citizenship eligibility to a group of older Samoans born between 1924 and 1949 when Samoa was still a New Zealand League of Nations mandate territory.

The Act grants New Zealand citizenship to:

- Persons who were born in Samoa between 13 May 1924 and 1 January 1949;
- A female, who before 1949, married a person who was born in Samoa between 13 May 1924 and 1 January 1949;
- A descendant of a person born in Samoa between 13 May 1924 and 1 January 1949 and was a British subject immediately before 1 January 1949;
- A female who, before 1 January 1949, married a descendant of a person born in Samoa between 13 May 1924 and 1 January 1949;
- A child of a person who has received New Zealand citizenship under the bill if it becomes law, who is born or adopted in New Zealand after their parent receives citizenship.

Individuals ineligible for New Zealand citizenship under this pathway include any descendant born in Samoa on or after 1 January 1949, and a child of a person who has received New Zealand citizenship under the bill if it becomes law, who is born or adopted outside New Zealand after their parent receives citizenship. Individuals in these categories would have to apply for New Zealand citizenship under different pathways.

While an earlier version of the bill would have repealed the Western Samoa Citizenship Act 1982, the revised version would amend the 1982 legislation to avoid affecting the 1962 Treaty of Friendship between Samoa and New Zealand, which is covered by the 1982 Act's provisions. The committee did not advance a Labour and Green proposal that the estimated 15,000 to 19,000 descendants of the groups born prior to 1 January 1962 be eligible for New Zealand citizenship.

== Legislative history ==
=== First reading ===
On 10 April 2024, the Bill passed its first reading with the support of the opposition Green, Labour, Te Pāti Māori and the government coalition parties ACT and New Zealand First. The governing National Party opposed the bill.

On 16 May, NZ First leader Winston Peters confirmed that his party would continue to support the Bill through Parliament's select committee but said that some changes were still needed to the Bill. Peters told RNZ that he disagreed with Green MP and bill sponsor Teanau Tuiono's category of Samoans who would be entitled to citizenship. In response Tuiono said he was willing to work with New Zealand First "to see what we can do to make this practical for everybody that's engaging in the process as well."

=== Select committee stage ===
Public submissions on the Restoring Citizenship Removed By Citizenship (Western Samoa) Act 1982 Bill closed on 31 May 2024. The Governance and Administration Committee received approximately 24,500 submissions on the bill. Hearings were held in-person and via Zoom in Wellington on 24 and 26 June 2024, and in Auckland on 1 July. Due to the large number of oral submissions, the committee split into two sub-committees to hear as many people. The Committee's membership consisted of chairperson Rachel Boyack, Cameron Brewer, Tim Costley, Andy Foster, Tom Rutherford, Lydia Sosene and Celia Wade-Brown. In its submission, the Pacific Lawyers Association had called for Parliament to expand the bill's coverage to include the 15,000 to 19,000 descendants of Samoans who had lost their New Zealand citizenship under the 1982 Act.

On 9 October 2024, the Governance and Administration Committee released its report and recommended that the Bill be unanimously passed except for clauses 6, 10 and 14. Clause 6 would have repealed the Citizenship (Western Samoa) Act 1982 while new sections were added to Clauses 10 and 14 to amend the 1982 legislation. A majority of the committee members agreed to limit eligibility for New Zealand citizenship to people described in section 4(1)(a) to (d) of the Citizenship (Western Samoa) Act 1982. This included people born in Western Samoa between 13 May 1921 and 1 January 1949; the descendants of those people born before 1 January 1949; and any female who, on 1 January 1949, became a New Zealand citizen by marrying a person in one of those two groups. Eligible individuals will not have to apply for New Zealand citizenship but will be granted it as a right. The committee did not advance a Labour and Green proposal that the descendants of the groups born prior to 1 January 1962 be eligible for New Zealand citizenship.

The bill's sponsor Tuiono welcomed the select committee's decision to progress the Bill towards a second reading, describing it as a "significant step forward and a monumental milestone for Pasifika justice in Aotearoa." While Tuiono and some other committee members had advocated repealing the original 1982 Act, the committee ultimately decided to amend the 1982 Act through the Restoring Citizenship bill to avoid affecting the 1962 Treaty of Friendship between Samoa and New Zealand, which is covered by the 1982 Act's provisions.

=== Second reading ===
The Bill passed its second reading on 25 October with the unanimous support of all parties. In his speech, National MP Tom Rutherford said that the testimonies of Samoan New Zealanders whose grandparents were affected by the law change helped the select committee members understand the bill's significance, which he described as a "pathway to reconciliation" and "a reminder of the special place that our Pacific neighbours hold in New Zealand's heart." Labour MP Barbara Edmonds thanked the 24,000 submitters who participated in the select committee process while the bill's sponsor Tuiono reiterated the Green Party's support for the legislation's progress into the Committee of the Whole House stage, where legislative details and technicalities would be tested.

=== Third reading ===
The Bill passed its third and final reading on 20 November 2024 with unanimous support. The bill's passage was welcomed by its sponsor Tuiono and former National MP Arthur Anae, a Samoan New Zealander who had lobbied for the law change for the past 27 years. 200 members of the public attended the third reading. National MP Cameron Brewer confirmed that eligible people would be able to apply for New Zealand citizenship from 26 November, after the Bill receives royal assent on 25 November.

Under the Bill's provisions, 3,480 Samoans are expected to be eligible for New Zealand citizenship.

== Reactions ==
Samoan Christian Fellowship secretary Reverend Aneterea Sa'u supported the Restoring Citizenship amendment bill, stating "for me it's about justice, it's about fairness...we're not looking for money..." He urged Samoan New Zealanders to reach out to their MPs after the Bill passed its first reading.

In late May 2024, Samoan community group "Mau a Samoa i le Sitiseni 2024" set up stations at shopping centres and community centres around South Auckland and West Auckland to encourage people to make submissions supporting the proposed bill.

Following the Government and Administration Committee's decision to progress the Bill towards a second reading in October 2024, Samoan New Zealander community advocate Te'o Tupuivao Harry Fatu Toleafoa welcomed the decision as part of a chain of events in New Zealand's relationship with Samoa including Prime Minister Helen Clark's 2002 apology for New Zealand's occupation of Samoa and Prime Minister Jacinda Ardern's 2021 apology for the Dawn raids of the 1970s.
