= Visa policy of Tonga =

Policy on permits required to enter Tonga

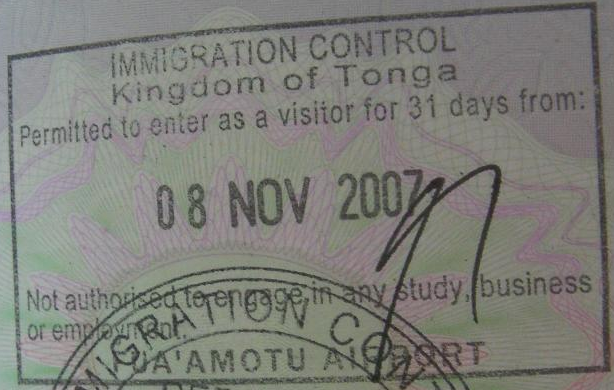
Entry stamp

Visitors to Tonga must obtain a visa unless they are citizens from one of the visa-exempt countries or citizens who may obtain a free visa on arrival. Visa applications must be sent to the Principal Immigration Officer in Nuku'alofa.

All visitors must have a passport valid for at least 6 months.

== Visa policy map ==
Visa policy of Tonga Tonga Visa not required (90 days) Visa not required (60 days) Visa not required (30 days) Free visa on arrival Visa required

== Visa exemption ==
Citizens of the following countries may enter Tonga without a visa for the following period in accordance with bilateral agreements:

90 days within any 180 days

- European Union member states (except Ireland)

- Iceland
- Israel
- Liechtenstein
- Norway
- Switzerland

60 days

- United Arab Emirates

30 days

- China

Date of visa changes
- 19 August 2016: China
- 1 December 2016: European Union member states (except Ireland), Iceland, Liechtenstein, Norway, Switzerland
- April 2017: Israel
- 24 May 2018: United Arab Emirates

== Visa on arrival ==
=== Free visa on arrival ===
Citizens of the following countries and territories may obtain a free visa on arrival (valid for 31 days, extendable to 6 months):

- Australia
- Bahamas
- Barbados
- Brazil
- Brunei
- Canada
- Dominica
- Fiji
- Hong Kong
- Ireland
- Japan
- Kiribati
- Malaysia
- Macau
- Marshall Islands
- Micronesia
- Monaco
- Nauru
- New Zealand
- Palau
- Papua New Guinea
- Russia
- Saint Kitts and Nevis
- Saint Lucia
- Saint Vincent and the Grenadines
- Samoa
- Seychelles
- Singapore
- Solomon Islands
- South Korea
- Turkey
- Tuvalu
- Ukraine
- United Kingdom
- United States
- Vanuatu

== See also ==
- Visa requirements for Tongan citizens
