= Oath of Citizenship (New Zealand) =

The Oath of Citizenship, as opposed to the Oath of Allegiance, is for new New Zealand citizens to pledge loyalty to the King of New Zealand, Charles III, and faithfully observe to the laws of New Zealand.

== Oath ==
The Oath, recited by citizenship recipients in New Zealand, is as follows:

"I, [name], swear that I will be faithful and bear true allegiance to His Majesty King Charles the Third, King of New Zealand, his heirs and successors according to law, and that I will faithfully observe the laws of New Zealand and fulfil my duties as a New Zealand citizen. So help me God."

The oath of citizenship in Māori (known as Te Oati Haumi) is as follows (without macrons):

“Ko ahau, ko [ingoa] e kī taurangi ana ka pirihonga ahau, ka piripono ki Te Arikinui Kīngi Tiāre te Tuatoru, te Kīngi o Aotearoa, me ōna uri ake me ōna whakakapi e ai ki te ture, ā, ka aro pirihonga ahau ki ngā ture o Aotearoa me te whakatutuki i āku mahi hei kirirarau o Aotearoa. Nō reira e te Atua, āwhinatia mai ahau.”

The Oath of citizenship may be recited either in English or in Māori.

== Affirmation ==
Those who object to adding 'God' to the end of an oath, may choose instead to make an Affirmation:

"I [name] solemnly and sincerely affirm that I will be faithful and bear true allegiance to His Majesty King Charles the Third, King of New Zealand, His heirs and successors according to the law, and that I will faithfully observe the laws of New Zealand and fulfil my duties as a New Zealand citizen."

In Māori (called Te Whakautanga Haumi), this is:

"Ko ahau, ko [ingoa] tēnei e whakaū pono ana ka pirihonga ahau, ka piripono ki Te Arikinui Kīngi Tiāre te Tuatoru, te Kīngi o Aotearoa, me ōna uri ake me ōna whakakapi e ai ki te ture, ā, ka aro pirihonga ahau ki ngā ture o Aotearoa me te whakatutuki i āku mahi hei kirirarau o Aotearoa."

== Citizenship ceremony ==
When an application for New Zealand citizenship is granted, applicants are required to attend a public citizenship ceremony.

Citizenship ceremonies were first held in 1954. Since 1955, groups of new citizens have publicly sworn allegiance to the Queen. New citizens from Commonwealth realms could take the oath in writing and get their certificates by post until 1996, when applicants were required to attend a public ceremony.

The public ceremony is a step in the process of becoming a New Zealand citizen. It is an opportunity for new citizens to publicly declare their allegiance to New Zealand and for the local community to welcome them on behalf of all New Zealanders. Here, applicants stand before an official person (normally the local Mayor) and take the Oath or Affirmation of Allegiance.

In doing so, applicants declare that they will honour Charles III, King of New Zealand, obey the laws of New Zealand and be a good citizen. It is only after swearing allegiance that applicants become a New Zealand citizen, and are presented with a Citizenship Certificate from the local mayor (or government officials in a private ceremony in the absence of the Mayoral ceremony). New citizens then join in the singing of "God Defend New Zealand" before enjoying a cup of tea or glass of wine, normally following the loyal toast.

== See also ==
- New Zealand nationality law
- Monarchy in New Zealand
- Oath of Allegiance (New Zealand)
