= British Nationality and New Zealand Citizenship Act 1948 =

New Zealand legislation

Parliament of New Zealand
- Citation: 1948 No 15
- Passed by: 28th New Zealand Parliament
- Passed: 9 September 1948
- Commenced: 1 January 1949
- Repealed: 1 December 1977

Repealed by
- Citizenship Act 1977 (1977 No 61)

Related legislation
- British Nationality Act 1948
- Status: Repealed

The British Nationality and New Zealand Citizenship Act 1948 (Public Act no. 15 of 1948) was an Act of the New Zealand Parliament passed into law in 1948 establishing New Zealand citizenship for New Zealanders, separate from their previous status as British subjects.

== Background ==
The Irish Free State was the first British Commonwealth country to create its own citizenship law, under the Irish Free State constitution. In 1946, Canada passed the Canadian Citizenship Act, establishing separate Canadian citizenship from 1947. The issue was debated at a Commonwealth conference on nationality and citizenship in 1947, where it was decided that each Commonwealth member would pass its own citizenship law.

In 1947 New Zealand's parliament passed the Statute of Westminster Adoption Act 1947. By doing so it gained the ability to create New Zealand citizenship and issue passports without the approval of the British Government. The impetus for New Zealand to pass the Act was Britain's parliament passing the British Nationality Act 1948 in July 1948, commencing from 1 January 1949. That Act created Commonwealth citizens as a replacement for the legal status of "British subjects".

== Debate ==
The Bill was read in the Legislative Council, the then upper house of New Zealand's parliament, on 1 September 1948. The Bill was passed into law on 6 September.

The Act came into force on 1 January 1949.

== Treaty of Waitangi ==
The Treaty of Waitangi is an agreement signed between representatives of the British Crown and Māori in 1840. Article three of the English language version of the Treaty states that Māori are granted all the rights and privileges of British subjects.

== Pacific Islands ==
In the case of Lesa v Attorney-General of New Zealand the Judicial Committee of the Privy Council, then the highest court of appeal in New Zealand, ruled that Samoans born between 1924 and 1948 were British subjects, and following the passing of the Act in 1948, they and their descendants became New Zealand citizens from 1 January 1949.

== Repeal ==
The Act was repealed by the Citizenship Act 1977.
