= Visa policy of New Zealand =

Policy on permits required to enter the Realm of New Zealand

Non–New Zealand citizens wishing to enter the Realm of New Zealand must obtain a visa unless they are

- a citizen or permanent resident of Australia or
- a citizen of one of the 60 visa waiver eligible countries and territories
- a holder of the United Nations laissez-passer or
- eligible for visa-free travel under other specific provisions (visiting force, cruise ship passengers and crew, aircraft crew, etc.).

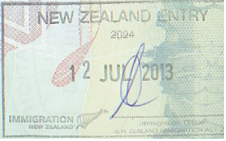
A New Zealand general entry stamp issued to a temporary entry class visa holder.

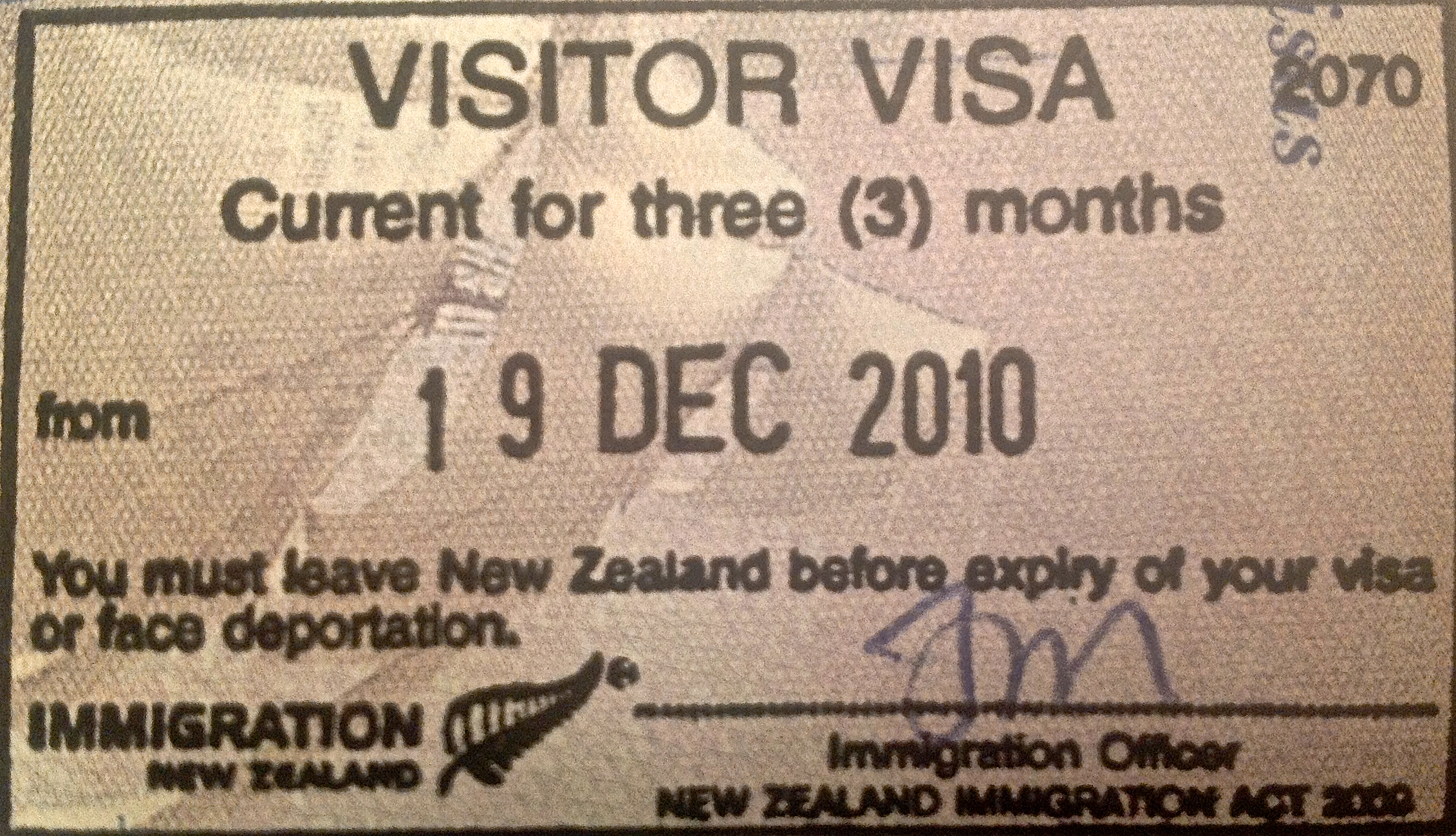
A New Zealand Visitor Visa stamp granted on arrival to a visa waiver traveller.

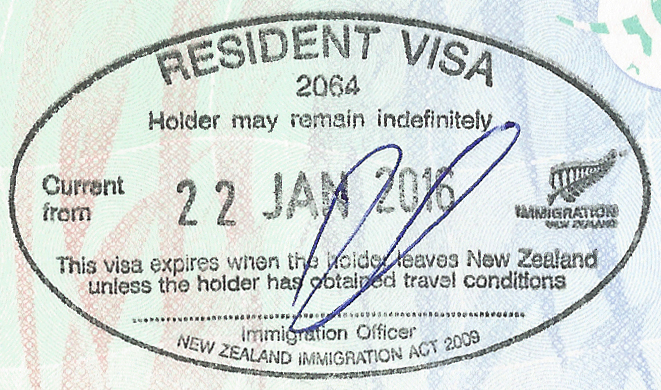
A New Zealand Resident Visa stamp granted on arrival under the Trans-Tasman Travel Arrangement on an Australian travel document. These stamps have been discontinued from 19 March 2018.

Both Australian citizens travelling on a valid Australian Passport and permanent residents of Australia that present a valid Permanent Visa or Resident Return Visa are deemed to hold resident status in New Zealand upon arrival under the Trans-Tasman travel arrangement.

Visitors must hold passports that are valid for at least 3 months beyond the period of intended stay. Visitors are required to hold proof of sufficient funds to cover their stay: NZ$1,000 per person per month of stay or NZ$400 if accommodation has been prepaid. Visitors are required to hold documents required for their next destination.

== Visa policy map ==
Visa policy of New Zealand New Zealand Visa not required for an indefinite period (Trans-Tasman Travel Arrangement) Electronic Travel Authority 6 months (NZeTA) Electronic Travel Authority 3 months (NZeTA) Electronic Travel Authority 3 months (NZeTA) if travelling directly from Australia excluding transit through Australia Online Visa

== Visa exemption ==
=== New Zealand Electronic Travel Authority ===
Since 1 October 2019, citizens of visa waiver countries/territories must apply for a New Zealand Electronic Travel Authority (NZeTA) prior to travel.

The NZeTA is mandatory for all sea and air arrivals, including transit, unless exempt. When issued, it remains valid for the period of 2 years.

As of 1 October 2019, the following people are eligible to travel without a visa but with an NZeTA:

- people granted a visa waiver by special direction;
- members of a visiting force (including members of the civilian component of the visiting force) as defined in the Visiting Forces Act 2004, but only if:
  - each person is travelling to New Zealand in the ordinary course of the person's duty or employment;
  - each person is seeking a temporary entry class visa at an immigration control area;
  - the craft transporting the visiting force is a commercial craft;
- cruise ship passengers;
- cruise ship crew travelling in the ordinary course of business of the ship;
- positioning cruise ship crew;
- aircraft crew of an aircraft on a flight between any other country and New Zealand in the course of a scheduled international service;
- positioning aircraft crew;
- British citizens, and any other British passport holder who can produce evidence of the right to reside permanently in the United Kingdom, but only if the person concerned is seeking a Visitor Visa current for not more than 6 months and the purposes of the visit do not include medical consultation or treatment;
- citizens of the following countries, but only if the person concerned is seeking a Visitor Visa current for not more than three months and the purpose of the visit is not for medical consultation or treatment:

- All European Union member states^{1} ^{4}
- All European Free Trade Association member states
- Pacific Islands Forum member states (with Australian Visa)

- Andorra
- Argentina
- Bahrain
- Brazil
- Brunei
- Canada
- Chile
- China (with Australian Visa)
- Hong Kong^{2}
- Israel
- Japan
- South Korea
- Macao^{3}
- Malaysia
- Mauritius
- Mexico
- Monaco
- Oman
- Qatar
- San Marino
- Saudi Arabia
- Seychelles
- Singapore
- Taiwan^{5}
- United Arab Emirates
- United States^{6}
- Uruguay
- Vatican City

- people with passports from China and Pacific Islands Forum countries can visit New Zealand from Australia without a visa. Instead of applying for a visa, if they have a valid eligible Australian visa, they will be able to travel to New Zealand on a New Zealand Electronic Travel Authority (NZeTA), and stay for up to 3 months. This does not include people transiting through Australia, and applicants will still need to meet the criteria for an NZeTA.This will be trialled for 12-months.
- people travelling on a United Nations laissez-passer who are seeking a Visitor Visa current for not more than three months;
- any other class of persons specified in the Immigration (Visa, Entry Permission, and Related Matters) Regulations 2010;

=== Exemption from NZeTA ===
The following visa waiver travellers are exempt from the requirement to hold a NZeTA before travelling to New Zealand:

- Under the Trans-Tasman Travel Arrangement, citizens of the Commonwealth of Australia
  - Holders of a current Permanent Residence Visa issued by the Government of Australia, and holders of a current Resident Return Visa issued by the Government of Australia do require an NZeTA but may obtain it free of charge
- members of, or any person associated with, a scientific programme or expedition under a Contracting Party to the Antarctic Treaty (within the meaning of the Antarctica Act 1960) or any person to whom section 5 of the Act applies, but only if:
  - the person concerned is seeking a temporary entry class visa;
  - the application is made at an immigration control area;

Notes
1. Visa waiver does not apply to people travelling on alien's (non-citizen's) passports issued by Estonia and Latvia.
2. Residents of Hong Kong travelling on Hong Kong Special Administrative Region or British National (Overseas) passports.
3. Residents of Macao travelling on Macao Special Administrative Region passports.
4. Portuguese passport holders must also have the right to live permanently in Portugal.
5. Permanent residents of Taiwan travelling on a Taiwan passport. A personal identity number printed within the visible section of the biographical page of the Taiwan passport demonstrates that the holder is a permanent resident of Taiwan.
6. Including nationals of the USA.

Date of visa changes
- Australian, British, Canadian and Irish citizens have never needed a visa to gain access to New Zealand
- 1 December 1947: France (Metropolitan France residents)
- 1 July 1948: Sweden
- 1 August 1948: Liechtenstein and Switzerland
- 1 January 1949: Denmark
- 1 April 1949: Netherlands
- 1 January 1950: Norway
- 1 July 1951: Luxembourg
- 15 November 1951: Belgium
- 1 July 1952: Monaco
- 15 June 1970: Japan
- 1 August 1972: Germany (as West Germany until 2 October 1990)
- 1 April 1973: Finland
- 1 February 1974: Iceland
- 1 January 1986: Italy
- 1 November 1986: Singapore
- 1 November 1987: Austria, France (New Caledonia and Tahiti residents), Greece, Malaysia, Malta, Portugal, Spain and United States (not including Nationals of USA)
- 1 July 1993: Brunei, South Korea and United States (Nationals of USA)
- 23 March 1995: France (all Overseas France residents)
- 16 July 1998: Israel
- 1 October 1998: Hong Kong and British Nationals (Overseas)
- 30 October 1998: Argentina
- 1 January 1999: Brazil, Chile and Uruguay
- 1 July 1999: Bahrain, Kuwait, Oman, Qatar, Saudi Arabia and United Arab Emirates
- 1 March 2000: Andorra, Hungary, San Marino, Slovenia and Vatican
- 1 December 2000: Mexico
- 1 October 2001: United Nations laissez-passer
- 1 January 2003: Czech Republic (resumed)
- 1 April 2005: Cyprus, Estonia, Latvia, Lithuania, Poland and Slovakia
- 30 July 2007: Bulgaria and Romania
- 30 November 2009: Taiwan
- 1 July 2013: Croatia
- 30 June 2014: Macao
- 21 November 2016: Mauritius and Seychelles
- 3 November 2025: China, Pacific Islands Forum(conditional)

Cancelled:

- Fiji, Samoa and Tonga: 18 February 1987
- Indonesia: 21 October 1998
- Czech Republic: 1 January 2001 (was resumed in 2003)
- Thailand: 1 January 2001
- Zimbabwe: 21 February 2003
- Kiribati, Nauru and Tuvalu: 8 December 2003
- South Africa: 21 November 2016
- Kuwait: 13 November 2026 (3-month suspension)

== Online Visa ==
New Zealand issues Online Visa for countries, that are not included of visa waiver countries.

== Visa types ==
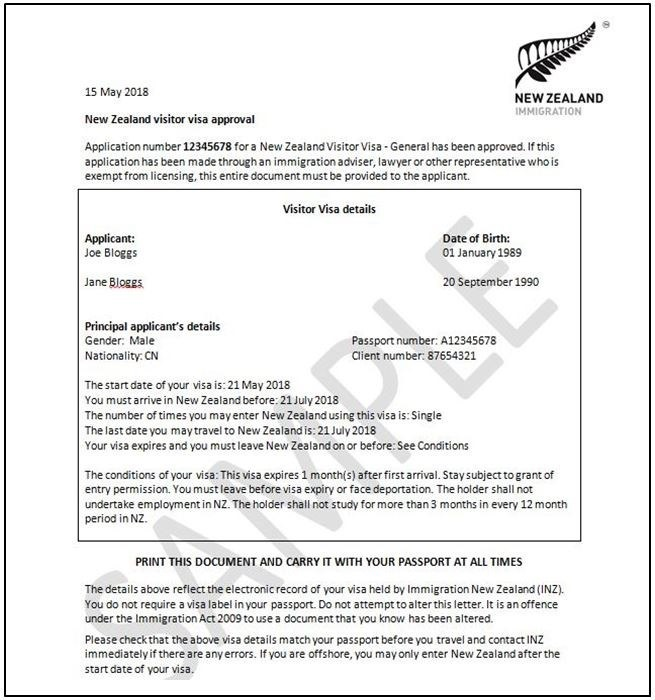
A specimen of a New Zealand eVisa confirmation letter, for a Visitor Visa.

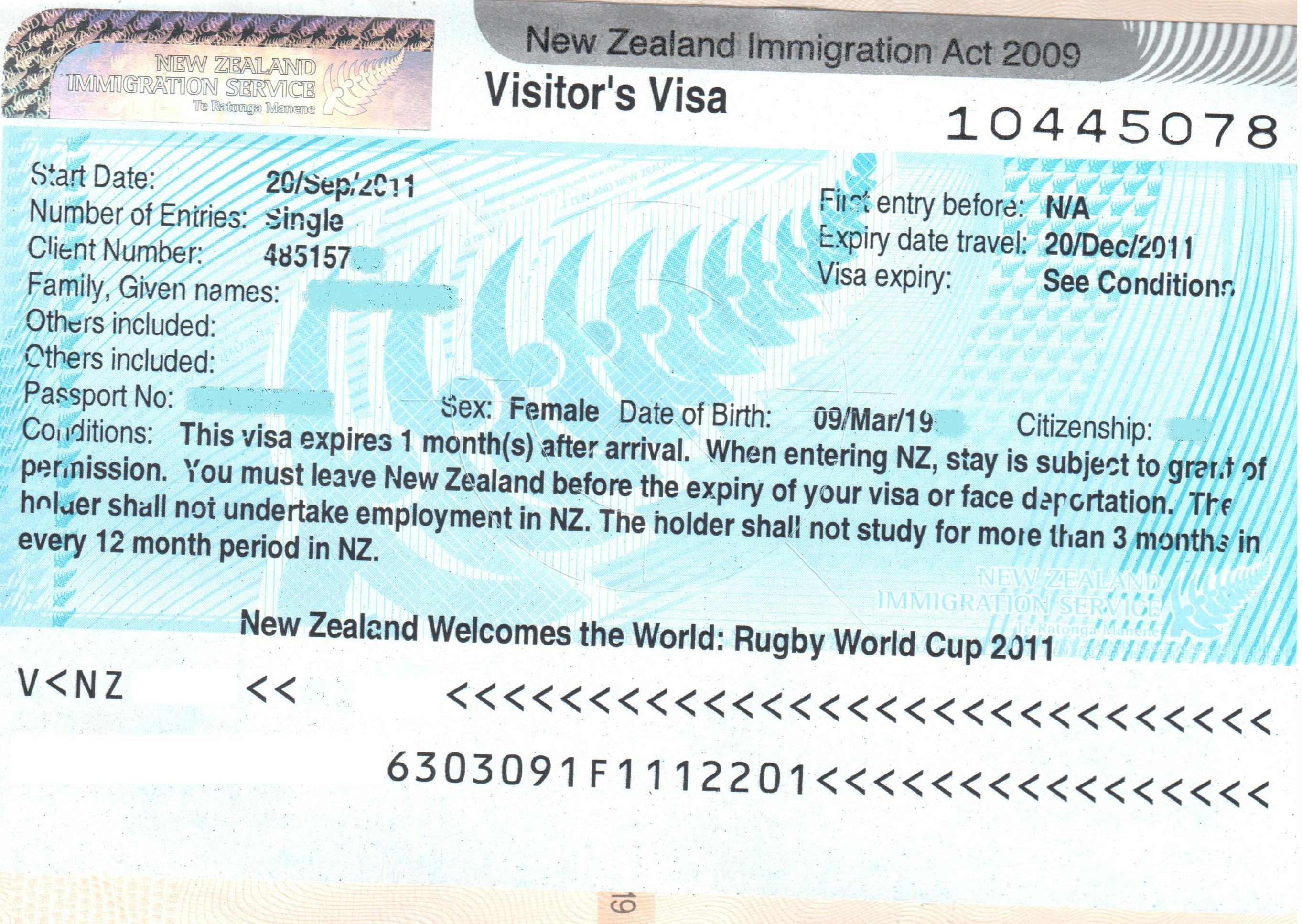
A New Zealand Visitor Visa label in a passport. Such labels are only issued upon request.

Any person who is not a New Zealand citizen may only travel to New Zealand if holding a valid visa or is a person to whom a visa waiver applies.

While there are many different categories of visa, they can be fundamentally broken down into three classes:

- Residence class visas allows the holder to work, study and remain in New Zealand indefinitely, and does not expire while the holder remains in New Zealand. Conditions may be placed on a Resident Visa: most commonly, these conditions specify a period of time where one may leave and re-enter New Zealand as a resident, but may also relate to other matters (for example, a migrant applying for residence under the Skilled Migrant Category may have a condition imposed of taking up an offer of skilled employment within 3 months of arrival). It is, however, possible for the holder of a Resident Visa to obtain a Permanent Resident Visa upon meeting all conditions and upon demonstrating a commitment to New Zealand, which allows the holder to work, study and remain in New Zealand unconditionally, as well as leave and re-enter New Zealand at any time, and the Permanent Resident Visa itself never expires.
- Temporary entry class visas have a set expiry date, and conditions placed upon them based on the category under which the holder applied for a visa. Visas intended for tourism, long-term study or foreign employment in New Zealand are typical examples of a temporary entry class visa.
- Transit visas allow the holder to pass through New Zealand on a journey between 2 sovereign states.

Holding a visa, or taking advantage of a visa waiver, does not in itself entitle a person to enter New Zealand itself: it only entitles the person to travel to New Zealand and apply for entry permission.

Entry permission to New Zealand must be granted to a person for that person to be able to enter New Zealand; this is typically done by an immigration officer at the border. Refusal of entry permission results in automatic visa cancellation, and the person being made liable for turnaround if the person has arrived at the border.

While most foreign nationals must apply for, and be granted, entry permission at the border, holders of a Permanent Resident Visa, a Resident Visa granted in New Zealand, or a Resident Visa granted outside New Zealand where the holder has previously travelled to New Zealand are granted entry permission as of right.

New Zealand does not stamp passports of New Zealand citizens, residence class visa holders, or Australian citizens and permanent residents.

Holders of a temporary entry class visa, or visa waiver travellers seeking a Visitor Visa on arrival may receive passport stamps if they enter through a staffed immigration counter instead of the automated eGates; however, Immigration New Zealand and the New Zealand Customs Service are investigating the possibility of removing passport stamps entirely.

== Transit ==
A person intending to travel and be in New Zealand as a transit passenger must apply for and obtain a Transit Visa before proceeding to New Zealand, unless this requirement is waived.

Transit facilities are only available at Auckland Airport, and transit passengers must remain in the transit area for the entire period of time in New Zealand and for not longer than 24 hours.

Transit passengers not passing through Auckland Airport, or who must leave the transit area of Auckland Airport, or who will remain in the transit area of Auckland Airport for longer than 24 hours are ineligible to enter New Zealand as a transit passenger and will need to obtain a Visitor Visa if they are not a visa waiver traveller.

=== Visa waiver transit ===
As of 20 June 2020, a visa waiver transit applies to, but is not limited to, the following people:

- a New Zealand citizen or residence class visa holder; or
- the holder of a temporary entry class visa with relevant travel conditions; or
- a person to whom a visa waiver applies, but only if they hold a transit or traveller Electronic Travel Authority, or are exempt from holding an Electronic Travel Authority; or
- if travelling to or from Australia:
  - a person whose immediate or final destination after transiting through New Zealand is Australia, but only if they hold a current visa issued by the Government of Australia to enter Australia, and they hold a transit Electronic Travel Authority; or
  - a person travelling from Australia and holding a transit Electronic Travel Authority; or
- a person that the Minister of Immigration has, by special direction, classified as a person to whom a transit visa waiver applies; or
- citizens of the following countries; but only if a transit Electronic Travel Authority is held:

- Bahamas
- Bermuda
- Bolivia
- China
- Colombia
- Costa Rica
- Ecuador
- Federated States of Micronesia
- Fiji
- Indonesia
- Kiribati
- Nauru
- Palau
- Panama
- Papua New Guinea
- Paraguay
- Peru
- Philippines
- Republic of Marshall Islands
- Samoa
- Solomon Islands
- Thailand
- Tonga
- Tuvalu
- Vanuatu
- Venezuela

== Associated states and dependent territories ==
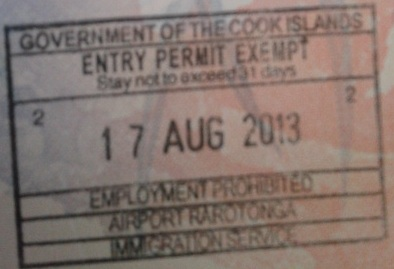
Cook Islands entry stamp issued at Rarotonga International Airport

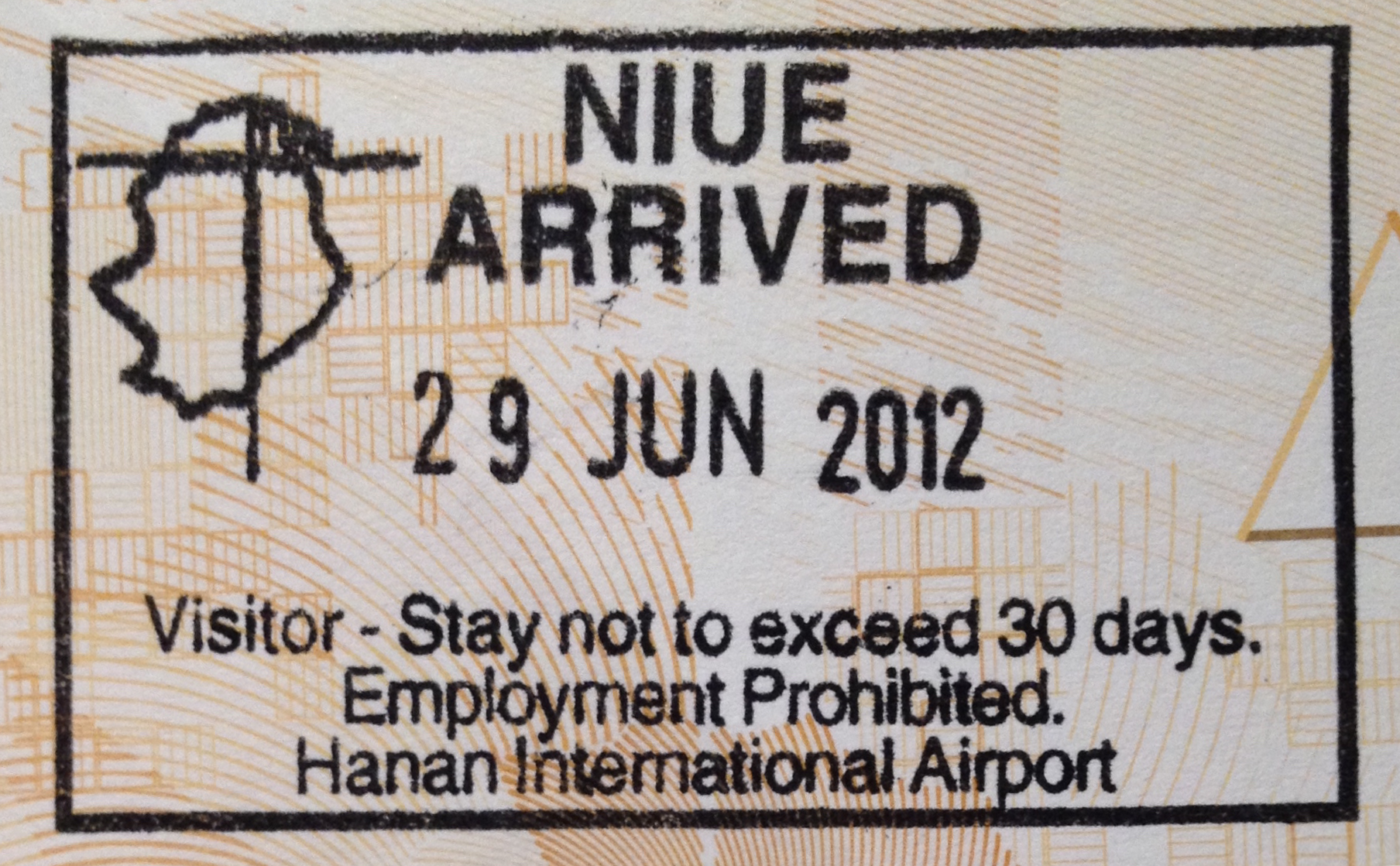
Niue entry stamp issued at Hanan International Airport

The associated states of the Cook Islands and Niue, and the dependent territory of Tokelau, have visa policies separate to that of New Zealand.

=== Cook Islands ===
Visa policy of Cook Islands The Cook Islands Visa not required (90 days) Visa not required (31 days)

All visitors to the Cook Islands may enter without a visa for up to 31 days, with the exception of New Zealand citizens, who are permitted to enter without a visa for up to 90 days. Visitors travelling for tourist purposes may extend their stay, for periods of 31 days, up to a maximum of 6 months.

=== Niue ===
Visa policy of Niue Niue Visa on arrival Visa required

Citizens of the following countries and territories do not need to apply for a visa before travelling and may obtain a 30-day visitor permit on arrival:

- Andorra
- Australia
- Austria
- Belgium
- Canada
- Cyprus
- Denmark
- Fiji
- Finland
- France
- Germany
- Greece
- Iceland
- Ireland
- Italy
- Japan
- Kiribati
- Liechtenstein
- Luxembourg
- Malta
- Marshall Islands
- Monaco
- Nauru
- Netherlands
- New Caledonia
- Norway
- Portugal^{1}
- Samoa
- San Marino
- Singapore
- Solomon Islands
- Spain
- Sweden
- Switzerland
- Tonga
- Tuvalu
- United Kingdom^{1}
- United States
- Vanuatu
- Vatican City

_{1 - Applies only to those holding the right of permanent residence.}

==== Required permits and extensions ====
All other passport holders must apply for a visitor visa before traveling. Travellers wishing to extend their stay beyond the initial 30 days must apply for an extension through the Immigration Office in Alofi.

=== Tokelau ===
Visa policy of Tokelau Tokelau Permit required

All visitors must obtain a permit to enter Tokelau from the Tokelau Apia Liaison Office in Apia, at least 2 weeks prior to travel.

Tokelau can only be reached by boat from Samoa and a permit from the Samoan Immigration Authorities is required to leave and re-enter Samoa.

=== Australian citizens and permanent residents ===
By virtue of the Trans-Tasman Travel Arrangement, Australian citizens and permanent residents are granted a Resident Visa on arrival if they are of good character. This Resident Visa expires when the holder leaves New Zealand; a variation of travel conditions may be sought if the holder later intends to re-enter New Zealand on that same visa.

This then allows the holder's residence in New Zealand to be considered continuous, which is an important factor if the holder intends to later apply for a Permanent Resident Visa or the grant of New Zealand citizenship.

== International Visitor Conservation and Tourism Levy ==
Many tourists, people on working holidays, and some students and workers coming to New Zealand must pay an International Visitor Conservation and Tourism Levy (IVL) of NZ$100.

This fee is payable at the time of applying for a visa or requesting an NZeTA.

=== Exemptions from the IVL ===
- Australian citizens and permanent residents are exempt from paying the IVL.
- The following Pacific Island nations's citizens are exempt from paying the IVL:

- American Samoa
- Cook Islands
- Fiji
- Kiribati
- Marshall Islands
- Micronesia
- Nauru
- Niue
- Palau
- Papua New Guinea
- Pitcairn Islands
- Samoa
- Solomon Islands
- Tonga
- Tuvalu
- Vanuatu

Additionally, exemptions exist for transit passengers arriving at and leaving from Auckland International Airport, holders of a Business Visitor Visa, and holders of an APEC Business Travel Card. Applicants for specific visas also do not need to pay the IVL.

== Unacceptable travel documents ==
Any travel document issued by the countries or sources listed below are unacceptable for travel to New Zealand, and visas will not be endorsed in them:

- Travel documents issued by regimes that the New Zealand Government does not recognise:
  - Turkish Republic of Northern Cyprus
  - Taiwan: diplomatic and official passports (however, New Zealand allows the entry of bona fide private permanent residents of Taiwan travelling on Taiwan passports)
- Travel documents issued by an unofficial source (for example, the World Service Authority)
- Collective passports issued by the following countries:
  - Federal Republic of Yugoslavia
  - Republic of Slovenia
- Investor passports issued by the following countries:
  - Kiribati
  - Nauru
- Tongan Protected Person passports (standard Tongan passports are acceptable)
- Most passports with the former USSR symbol
- All Somali travel documents; there is no authority in Somalia that is recognised by the New Zealand Government as being competent to issue passports on behalf of Somalia
  - Somali citizens may use a New Zealand Certificate of Identity, or another acceptable travel document
- Travel documents that do not meet the requirements of "the definition of passport or certificate of identity" under Section 4 of the Immigration Act 2009:
  - Islamic Emirate of Afghanistan passports
  - United Nations Transitional Administration in East Timor travel documents
  - Iraqi S series passport
  - Egyptian travel documents issued for Palestinian refugees, unless they include an entry visa allowing the holder to enter Egypt

== APEC Business Travel Card ==
Holders of passports issued by the following countries who possess an APEC Business Travel Card (ABTC) with the "NZL" code on the reverse that denotes it is valid for travel to New Zealand can enter visa-free for business trips for up to 90 days.

ABTCs are issued to nationals of:

- Australia
- Brunei
- Chile
- China
- Hong Kong
- Indonesia
- Japan
- South Korea
- Malaysia
- Mexico
- Papua New Guinea
- Peru
- Philippines
- Russia
- Singapore
- Taiwan
- Thailand
- Vietnam

== Statistics ==
New Zealand issued 262,033 general visitor visas in the 2016/17 fiscal year. Top nationalities were:

Applicant nationality	Number of general visitor visas issued
China	183,692
India	45,906
Indonesia	14,378
Fiji	13,511
Philippines	17,730
Thailand	15,074
South Africa	11,232
Vietnam	10,216
Tonga	9,918
Samoa	9,438
Russia	5,036

Most visitors came from the following countries of residence:

Country	2012	2013	2014	2015	2016	2017	Change (%) 2016-17	2018
Australia	1,155,792	1,218,016	1,247,760	1,326,800	1,409,200	1,472,160	▲4.5	1,494,541
China, People's Republic of	197,024	228,928	264,864	355,904	409,008	417,872	▲2.2	448,189
United States	177,680	201,424	220,512	243,104	291,392	330,128	▲13.3	352,074
United Kingdom	189,648	191,632	194,416	203,952	220,976	249,264	▲12.8	237,166
Germany	63,776	69,808	78,912	84,544	96,848	104,864	▲8.3	102,087
Japan	72,080	74,560	81,136	87,328	100,736	102,048	▲1.3	99,784
Korea, Republic of	52,896	50,992	55,488	64,992	82,384	91,168	▲10.7	87,853
Canada	46,448	48,192	48,800	52,352	59,760	67,280	▲12.6	71,261
India	29,856	30,976	37,392	46,000	52,016	61,440	▲18.1	67,953
Singapore	36,400	42,256	46,848	49,584	57,344	58,544	▲2.1	61,464
Hong Kong	26,272	28,080	31,456	36,288	44,768	54,688	▲22.2	58,763
Malaysia	29,424	28,976	31,536	34,240	51,792	53,840	▲4.0	56,430
Other countries	487,322	503,855	518,280	546,839	623,715	670,411	▲7.5	
Total	2,564,618	2,717,695	2,857,400	3,131,927	3,499,939	3,733,707	▲6.7	3,863,217

== History ==
=== Before 1881 ===
In the early years New Zealand was seen by Europeans as the most remote country on earth. For most Europeans New Zealand was an unappealing prospect, a strange and lonely land reached after 100 days on dangerous seas; its coasts were thought treacherous, its inhabitants bloodthirsty.

Only exceptional reasons led people to set off for such a distant corner of the globe.

Many of New Zealand's early immigrants first spent time in Australia, and most of them were only temporary visitors in search of items to trade.

Among the earliest visitors were sealers, attracted by the promise of high-quality oil, and fur for hats (often sold in China in return for tea). As early as 1792, whalers came to the northern end of the country, also as temporary visitors.

Also missionaries arrived in New Zealand. By 1839 the total non-Māori population was about 2,000.

Until 1839 there were only about 2,000 immigrants in New Zealand; by 1852 there were about 28,000.

The decisive moment for this remarkable change was 1840. In that year, the Treaty of Waitangi was signed. This established British authority in European eyes, and gave British immigrants legal rights as citizens. Most of the people who moved to New Zealand Company settlements were British.

From 1853 to 1870 the non-Māori population of New Zealand rose from just under 30,000 to over 250,000. As with the inflow of the 1840s, there were three main groups – assisted families coming directly from Britain; individuals from across the Tasman Sea looking for a better life; and military settlers.

=== 1881–1914 ===
Restrictions on immigration were first imposed in 1881. Until then, anyone who arrived in New Zealand had been able to remain in the country.

The Chinese Immigrants Act 1881 was the first to restrict the entry of a specific group of people.

The number of Chinese who could arrive on one ship was limited to one for every 10 tons of the vessel's weight. A poll tax of £10 was also imposed on each Chinese person entering the country.

Unlike the Chinese, most Indians were British subjects and free to enter New Zealand until the very end of the 19th century. From 1896, despite objections from the British government, New Zealand tried to pass more comprehensive legislation restricting the immigration not just of the Chinese but also of Indians and other Asians.

The 1899 act prohibited the entry of immigrants who were not of British or Irish parentage and who could not fill in an application form 'in any European language' – which in practice meant English. These rules were in place for the next 20 years. The fear of economic competition was one reason why the entry of Chinese, Indians and other 'race aliens' was restricted.

=== 1914–1945 ===
Under the War Regulations of 1916, during the First World War, no person over the age of 15 could land in New Zealand without a passport or other document establishing his or her nationality or identity.

Under the Undesirable Immigrants Exclusion Act 1919, Germans and Austro-Hungarians were prohibited from entering without a licence issued by the attorney general. The act also gave power to the attorney general to prohibit the entry of any person not resident in New Zealand – including British subjects – who was disaffected or disloyal, or of such a character that his presence would be injurious to the peace, order and good government' of New Zealand.

The Immigration Restriction Amendment Act 1920 was passed primarily to restrict possible Asian immigration, but Asians were not its only targets. It was also used to curb the entry of other non-British people, particularly Southern Europeans such as Dalmatians and Italians.

The 1931 Immigration Restriction Amendment Act, passed during the Depression period of the 1930s, prevented aliens (as non-British immigrants were still known) from Europe entering New Zealand. The only exceptions were if they had guaranteed employment, a considerable amount of capital, or knowledge and skills.

=== 1945–1987 ===
From 1961 only Australians had unrestricted entry to New Zealand. This was a long-standing right, established in 1840 when New Zealand became a British colony like Australia. Reciprocal travel arrangements, beginning in the 1920s, formalised this free movement from one country to the other. In 1973, the Trans-Tasman Travel Arrangement allowed Australian and New Zealand citizens to enter each other's countries to visit, live, work, or remain indefinitely without having to apply for a permit.

Under the 1961 Immigration Amendment Act, British and Irish immigrants, along with other non-New Zealand citizens (except Australians, who could enter freely) were required to have a permit before entering New Zealand. In practice, the permit was only a formality for Britons and Irish; they were issued with permits on arrival. Nevertheless, for the first time, the 1961 act put British and non-British people on the same footing when they sought to enter New Zealand. After the immigration policy review of 1974, British migrants, like all others, were required to obtain a permit before they left their homelands. The British and Irish were now on the same footing as the nationals of other countries.

Between the 1940s and the 1970s, New Zealand concluded visa-free agreements with countries of Western Europe.

=== 1987–2019 ===
Visa policy of New Zealand from 1987 to 2017 New Zealand Visa free access

On 1 November 1987, the Immigration Act 1987 came into force which changed the selection process for immigrants to one of merit, finalising a shift that had begun in the 1960s away from the emphasis at the time on nationality and ethnic origin as the basis for determining which immigrants were to be admitted. Immigrants were now selected in three categories: skills and business, family and humanitarian.

The skills and business stream was originally based on an occupational priority list, but was replaced with a points system in 1991. The changes led to an increase in migration from non-traditional source countries (in particular from Asian countries), as it was now easier for these people to migrate to New Zealand.

Immigration legislation was later overhauled by the Immigration Act 2009, which came into effect on 29 November 2010. It modernised the earlier 1987 legislation, but did not make major changes to the criteria under which immigrants would apply to travel to and stay in New Zealand.

From 1987, visa-free access was provided to more countries, most notably Eastern European countries as they became members of the European Union. At the same time, illegal immigration saw the visa-free access of many Pacific and African nations being revoked.

The most recent amendment was made on 17 October 2016, which granted visa-free access for citizens of Mauritius and Seychelles, and revoked visa-free access for citizens of South Africa.

== See also ==
- Visa requirements for New Zealand citizens
- Trans-Tasman travel arrangement
