= Tongan passport =

Passport issued to citizens of Tonga

- The front cover of a Tongan passport.
- Type: Passport
- Issued by: Tonga
- Purpose: Identification
- Eligibility: Tongan citizenship
- Expiration: 10 years

The Tongan passport is an international travel document that is issued to Tongan citizens.

== Visa requirements ==
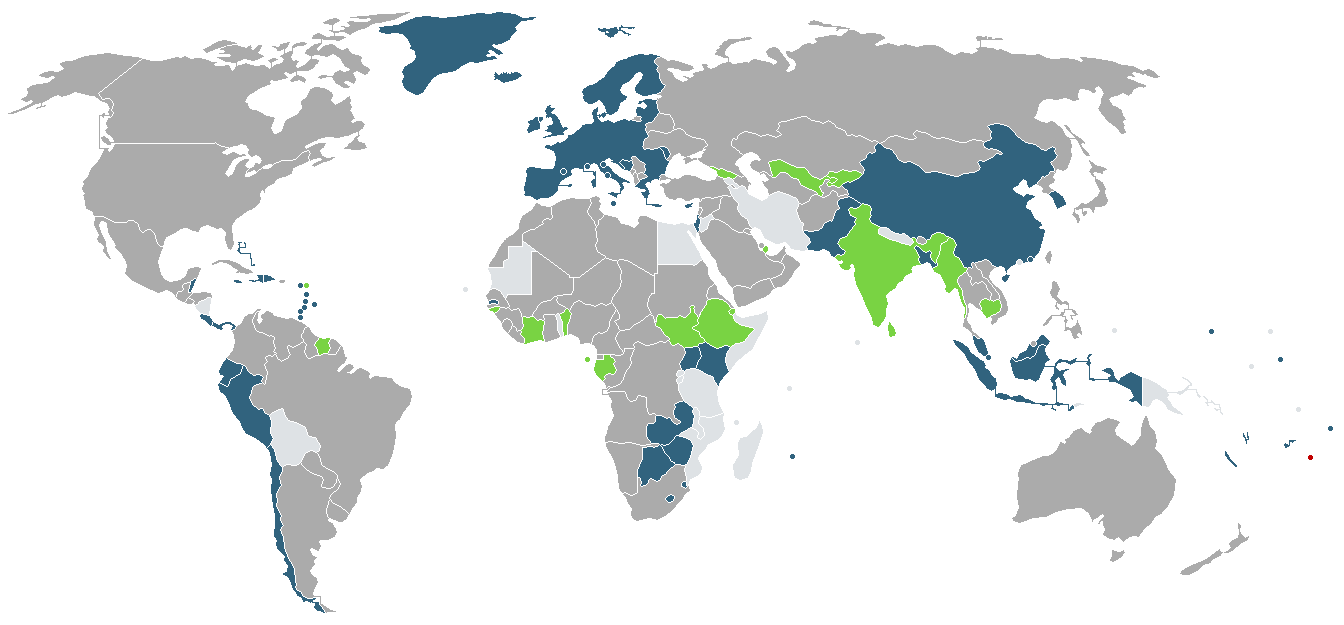
Visa requirements for Tongan citizens Tonga Visa-free Visa on arrival eVisa Visa required

In 2017, Tongan citizens holding regular Tongan passports had visa-free or visa on arrival access to 111 countries and territories, ranking the Tongan passport 47th in the world according to the Visa Restrictions Index. Tonga signed a mutual visa waiver agreement with Schengen Area countries on 20 November 2015.

== Tongan Protected Person passport ==
Tongan Protected Person passports were sold by the King of Tonga to persons who are not a Tongan citizen. Tongan Protected Person passport holders cannot enter or settle in Tonga on this passport. Generally, those holders are refugees, stateless persons, and individuals who for political reasons do not have access to any other passport-issuing authority.

Some countries/regions, e.g., Hong Kong, do not recognize the Tongan Protected Person passport as a legitimate travel document, and refuse entry to the holder attempting to enter on this passport.

== See also ==
- Visa requirements for Tongan citizens
