= New Zealand nationality law =

Citizenship Act 1977

New Zealand Parliament
- Long title: An Act to make better provision with respect to the status of New Zealand citizenship, and to consolidate and amend the British Nationality and New Zealand Citizenship Act 1948
- Citation: 1977 No 61
- Territorial extent: Realm of New Zealand (New Zealand, Cook Islands, Niue, Tokelau, and Ross Dependency)
- Enacted by: 38th New Zealand Parliament
- Assented to by: Governor-General Keith Holyoake
- Royal assent: 1 December 1977
- Commenced: 1 January 1978
- Administered by: Department of Internal Affairs
- Introduced by: Allan Highet, Minister of Internal Affairs

Repeals
- British Nationality and New Zealand Citizenship Act 1948 (1948 No 15)
- Status: Amended

The primary law governing nationality of New Zealand is the Citizenship Act 1977, which came into force on 1 January 1978. The act applies to the entire Realm of New Zealand, which comprises New Zealand, the Cook Islands, Niue, Tokelau, and the Ross Dependency.

Anyone born within the Realm before 2006 automatically received citizenship at birth regardless of the nationalities of their parents. Individuals born in the Realm from 2006 receive New Zealand citizenship at birth if at least one of their parents is a New Zealand citizen. They are also entitled to citizenship if a parent is a permanent resident of New Zealand or Australia, or an Australian citizen. Foreign nationals may become New Zealand citizens by grant after meeting a minimum residence requirement, usually five years.

New Zealand was previously a colony of the British Empire and local residents were British subjects. Over time, the colony was granted more autonomy and gradually became an independent sovereign state. New Zealand established its own citizenship in 1948 and ended preferences previously given to citizens of other Commonwealth countries in 1977. Although New Zealand citizens are no longer British, they remain Commonwealth citizens under British law. When residing in the United Kingdom, New Zealanders are eligible to vote in UK elections and stand for public office there.

== Terminology ==
The distinction between the meaning of the terms citizenship and nationality is not always clear in the English language and differs by country. Generally, nationality refers to a person's legal belonging to a sovereign state and is the common term used in international treaties when referring to members of a country, while citizenship usually means the set of rights and duties a person has in that nation. This distinction is more clearly defined in many non-English-speaking jurisdictions than in the Anglosphere. In the New Zealand context, there is little distinction between the two terms and they are used interchangeably; New Zealand nationals have been referred to as citizens in domestic nationality legislation since 1948.

== History ==
=== Colonial-era policy ===
New Zealand became a part of the British Empire in 1840 after the signing of the Treaty of Waitangi. Accordingly, British nationality law applied to the colony. Anyone born in New Zealand was a British subject, including indigenous Māori, who were extended all rights as British subjects under the terms of the treaty.

Any person born in New Zealand, the United Kingdom, or anywhere else within Crown dominions was a natural-born British subject. Foreign nationals had limited property rights and could not own land. French and German immigrants successfully lobbied the government for the ability to naturalise in 1844. Individuals intending to become British subjects needed to request that their names be included in annual naturalisation ordinances or acts passed by the governor or General Assembly that regularly granted foreigners subject status.

British nationality law during this time was uncodified and did not have a standard set of regulations, relying instead on past precedent and common law. Until the mid-19th century, it was unclear whether rules for naturalisation in the United Kingdom were applicable elsewhere in the British Empire. Each colony had wide discretion in developing its own procedures and requirements for naturalisation up to that point. In 1847, the Imperial Parliament formalised a distinction between subjects who naturalised in the UK and those who did so in other territories. Individuals who naturalised in the UK were deemed to have received the status by imperial naturalisation, which was valid throughout the Empire. Those naturalising in colonies were said to have gone through local naturalisation and were given subject status valid only within the relevant territory; a subject who locally naturalised in New Zealand was a British subject there, but not in England or New South Wales. When travelling outside the Empire, British subjects who were locally naturalised in a colony were still entitled to imperial protection.

Naturalisation continued to be processed through annual personalised legislation until 1866, when the process was streamlined. Individuals living in or intending to reside in New Zealand who met a good character requirement and were able to pay a £1 fee could apply for naturalisation with the Colonial Secretary's Office. There was no minimum residence requirement, and applicants needed only the governor's approval. British subjects who had already been naturalised in the United Kingdom or other parts of the Empire (except for its colonies in Asia) could apply to be naturalised again in New Zealand without swearing an oath of allegiance if they had previously taken one, since they already owed allegiance to the Sovereign. Foreign women who married British subjects were considered to have automatically naturalised under the new regulations. New Zealand was the first self-governing nation to grant the right to vote to women; British subject women participated in their first elections in 1893.

==== Māori conflicts and integration ====
Rising tensions over land sale disputes and settler incursions into Māori land led to a series of armed conflicts and mass land confiscations in the 1860s. The colonial government also pursued legislative efforts to assimilate Māori into its legal systems. Ambiguous wording in the Treaty of Waitangi raised uncertainty as to whether Māori were granted subjecthood or merely the rights of that status; the Native Rights Act 1865 was enacted to affirm their British subject status and clarify the colonial judiciary's legal authority over them. Franchise qualification depended on individual landownership, but Māori land was customarily held in communal title rather than by freehold title under a single person's ownership. Māori electorates in the General Assembly were created in 1867 as a temporary measure while Māori land was gradually converted into titles recognisable in colonial law, and this special representation was made permanent in 1876. Male subjects of partial Māori descent were assigned to an electorate based on their ancestry; those who were more than half-Māori were assigned to the Māori electoral roll, and those with more non-Māori lineage went on the general roll. Men who were exactly half-Māori could vote in either electorate, or in both.

==== Discriminatory policies against Chinese migrants ====
Chinese immigration to New Zealand began in the 1860s during the West Coast gold rush. Under the Public Health Act 1876, China, Hong Kong, Mauritius, and the islands of modern Indonesia were declared to be "infected places". Ships originating from, stopping at, or carrying persons or cargo from them were subject to strict quarantine on arrival in New Zealand. Growing anti-Chinese sentiment along with the rise of colonial nationalism led to a concerted movement within the legislature to restrict Chinese immigration. At least 20 bills to curb Chinese migration were introduced in the House of Representatives from 1879 to 1920. The first of these to pass was the Chinese Immigrants Act 1881, which limited the number of Chinese migrants who could land in New Zealand to one per ten tons of cargo and imposed a £10 head tax on every Chinese person who entered the colony. These restrictions were tightened to one migrant per 100 tons in 1888, then to one per 200 tons in 1896. The head tax was increased to £100 in 1896, and would not be abolished until 1944. Chinese residents were prohibited from naturalising as British subjects from 1908 to 1952.

==== Territorial acquisitions ====
The Cook Islands, Tokelau, and Niue became British protectorates in 1888, 1889, and 1901 respectively. Island residents became British subjects when the United Kingdom acquired these territories. The United Kingdom then ceded administrative control over the Cook Islands and Niue to New Zealand in 1901, and over Tokelau in 1925. The transfers of the islands did not alter the national status of these islanders, and they continued to be British subjects under New Zealand administration.

Western Samoa was a German territory from 1900 until the First World War. After the war, it became a League of Nations mandate under New Zealand control. Following the recommendation of the Permanent Mandates Commission, Western Samoans did not automatically become British subjects when New Zealand assumed mandatory authority in 1920 but were treated as British protected persons. Although Parliament amended nationality law in 1923 and 1928 to allow facilitated naturalisation for Western Samoans seeking to become British subjects, few took this option. Only 50 Samoans naturalised between 1928 and 1948, while 82 individuals of European descent had completed the process in the territory in the same period. All other Samoans who did not naturalise had an unresolved status until after Western Samoan independence.

=== Imperial common code ===
The Imperial Parliament brought regulations for British subject status into codified statute law for the first time with passage of the British Nationality and Status of Aliens Act 1914. British subject status was standardised as a common nationality across the Empire. Dominions that adopted this act as part of local legislation were authorised to grant subject status to aliens by imperial naturalisation. New Zealand adopted most of this law (Parts I and III) in 1923, except for its provisions on imperial naturalisation (Part II), which it later enacted in 1928.

The 1914 regulations codified the doctrine of coverture into imperial nationality law, under which a woman's consent to marry a foreigner was assumed to imply intent to denaturalise; British women who married foreign men automatically lost their British nationality. There were two exceptions to this: a woman whose husband lost his British subject status was able to retain British nationality by declaration, and a British-born widow or divorcée who had lost her British nationality through marriage could reacquire that status without meeting residence requirements after her marriage ended.

A woman whose foreign husband later naturalised as a British subject was automatically granted his new nationality, regaining her British status. New Zealand women who married Chinese men were severely affected by the coverture regulations, because of the naturalisation prohibition on all Chinese during this period. Any woman in such a marriage had no path to British nationality until her marriage ended.

By the end of the First World War, the Dominions had exercised increasing autonomy in managing their own affairs and each had developed a distinct national identity. Britain formally recognised Dominion autonomy at the 1926 Imperial Conference, jointly issuing the Balfour Declaration with all the Dominion heads of government. The Declaration stated that the United Kingdom and Dominions were autonomous and equal to each other within the British Commonwealth of Nations. Full legislative independence was granted to the Dominions with passage of the Statute of Westminster 1931.

Women's rights groups throughout the Empire pressured the imperial government during this time to amend nationality regulations that tied a married woman's status to that of her husband. Because the British government could no longer enforce legislative supremacy over the Dominions after 1931 and wanted to maintain a strong constitutional link to them through the common nationality code, it was unwilling to make major changes without unanimous Dominion agreement on this issue, which it did not have. Imperial legal uniformity was nevertheless eroded during the 1930s; New Zealand and Australia amended their laws in 1935 and 1936 to allow women denaturalised by marriage to retain their rights as British subjects, and Ireland changed its regulations in 1935 so that a woman's nationality was unaffected by marriage.

=== Changing relationship with Britain ===
Diverging developments in Dominion nationality laws, as well as growing assertions of local national identity separate from that of Britain and the Empire, culminated with the creation of a substantive Canadian citizenship in 1946, breaking the system of a common imperial nationality. That rupture, combined with the approaching independence of India and Pakistan in 1947, made comprehensive nationality law reform necessary to address ideas that were incompatible with the previous system. The Dominion governments agreed on the principle of equal standing for women in a reformed nationality system at the 1946 Commonwealth Prime Ministers' Conference and New Zealand amended its law to grant equal nationality rights in that same year.

New Zealand enacted the British Nationality and New Zealand Citizenship Act 1948 to create its own citizenship. The new act came into force on the same date as the British Nationality Act 1948, which took effect across the Empire. All British subjects who were born, naturalised, or resident for at least 12 months in New Zealand automatically acquired New Zealand citizenship on 1 January 1949. British subjects born to a father who was born or naturalised in New Zealand also automatically acquired citizenship on that date, as did British subject women married to a New Zealand citizen. Cook Islanders, Niueans, Tokelauans, and British subjects born in Western Samoa became New Zealand citizens automatically as well.

The 1948 act redefined the term British subject as any citizen of New Zealand or another Commonwealth country. Commonwealth citizen was defined in this act to have the same meaning. This combined status co-existed with the citizenships of each Commonwealth country. Irish citizens were treated as if they were British subjects, despite Ireland's exit from the Commonwealth in 1949. All Commonwealth and Irish citizens were eligible to become New Zealand citizens by registration, rather than naturalisation, after residing in New Zealand for at least three years. Commonwealth and Irish women who were married to New Zealand citizens were eligible to acquire citizenship by registration with no further requirements. Foreign wives and minor children of male New Zealand citizens were allowed to register as citizens at the discretion of the Minister of Internal Affairs. All other foreign nationals could acquire citizenship by naturalisation after at least five years of residence.

All British subjects under the reformed system initially held an automatic right to settle in the United Kingdom and Ireland. British authorities systematically discouraged non-white immigration to the UK, but strong economic conditions in Britain following the Second World War attracted an unprecedented wave of colonial migration. In response, the British Parliament imposed immigration controls on any subjects originating from outside the UK and Ireland with the Commonwealth Immigrants Act 1962. Ireland had continued to allow all British subjects free movement despite independence in 1922 as part of the Common Travel Area arrangement, but moved to mirror Britain's restriction in 1962 by limiting this ability only to people born on the islands of Great Britain or Ireland. Britain somewhat relaxed these measures in 1971 for patrials, subjects whose parents or grandparents were born in the United Kingdom, which gave effective preferential treatment to white Commonwealth citizens.

New Zealand passports were no longer labelled with the phrase "British passport" from 1964. They stopped listing national status as "British subject and New Zealand citizen" in 1974. In 1975, voting rights were extended to all individuals permanently resident in the country for at least one year. Prior to that year, British subject status was required to participate in elections. Political candidates of all ancestries were permitted to stand for election in Māori electorates from 1967. All Māori voters, irrespective of the degree of their ancestry, could participate in either Māori or general electorates from 1975.

=== Transition to national citizenship ===
By the 1970s and 1980s, most colonies of the British Empire had become independent and remaining ties to the United Kingdom had significantly weakened. New Zealand made further reforms to its nationality law in 1977 that abolished the preferences afforded to citizens from other Commonwealth countries and made citizenship transferable by descent through mothers as well as fathers. Foreign nationals now become New Zealand citizens "by grant" rather than by naturalisation. Commonwealth and Irish citizens remain defined as non-foreign in New Zealand law, but the status confers no benefits. The UK itself updated its nationality law to reflect the reduced extent of its remaining territories and possessions with the British Nationality Act 1981, which redefined British subject to no longer also mean Commonwealth citizen. New Zealand citizens continue to be Commonwealth citizens and are still eligible to vote and stand for public office in the UK.

Successful applicants take an oath or affirmation of citizenship pledging their loyalty to the New Zealand monarch, who is the same person as the British sovereign. There have been formal reviews of the oath and attempts to change it to mention allegiance to the country of New Zealand or its people in place of or alongside the monarch. The oath remains unchanged.

New Zealand ended unrestricted birthright citizenship in 2005. Children born in New Zealand from 2006 are granted citizenship by birth only if at least one parent is a citizen or otherwise has permission to remain in the country indefinitely.

==== Nationality arrangements for former territories ====
Western Samoa became independent in 1962. Legislation in the 1920s had allowed Samoans to become British subjects by naturalisation but left the status of those who had not completed the formal process unclear. New Zealand legislation after Samoan independence caused a significant number of Samoans already living in New Zealand to become illegal immigrants. In 1982, the Judicial Committee of the Privy Council ruled that all Western Samoans born between 1924 and 1948 were British subjects and automatically became New Zealand citizens in 1949. This decision would have granted New Zealand citizenship to an estimated 100,000 Samoans, out of a total population of 160,000 at the time.

Faced with the prospect of a brain drain if large numbers of its people exercised their newfound dual citizenship rights, Western Samoa signed the Protocol to the Treaty of Friendship with New Zealand on 21 August 1982. This treaty, and the subsequent Citizenship (Western Samoa) Act 1982, effectively nullified the Privy Council ruling. This act affirmed citizenship for Samoans who were already present in New Zealand before 15 September 1982, but required those who entered after that date to first become permanent residents. Since passage of the Citizenship (Western Samoa) (Restoration) Amendment Act 2024, Samoans born in that territory between 1924 and 1948 who remain domiciled there are eligible to apply for New Zealand citizenship.

The Cook Islands became a self-governing state in free association with New Zealand in 1965, and Niue entered the same arrangement in 1974. New Zealand retained responsibility for defence and foreign affairs in both, and their residents remain New Zealand citizens.

== Acquisition and loss of citizenship ==
=== Entitlement by birth, descent, or adoption ===
Nationality regulations apply to the entire Realm of New Zealand. New Zealand airspace, its internal and territorial waters, and New Zealand-registered ships and aircraft are also treated as part of the Realm for nationality purposes.

Anyone born within the Realm before 2006 automatically received citizenship at birth regardless of the nationalities of their parents. Individuals born in the Realm from 2006 receive New Zealand citizenship at birth if at least one parent is a New Zealand citizen or otherwise entitled to remain in New Zealand indefinitely. Children born overseas are New Zealand citizens by descent if either parent is a citizen otherwise than by descent. Adopted children are treated as if they were naturally born to the adopting parents at the time of adoption.

=== Voluntary acquisition ===
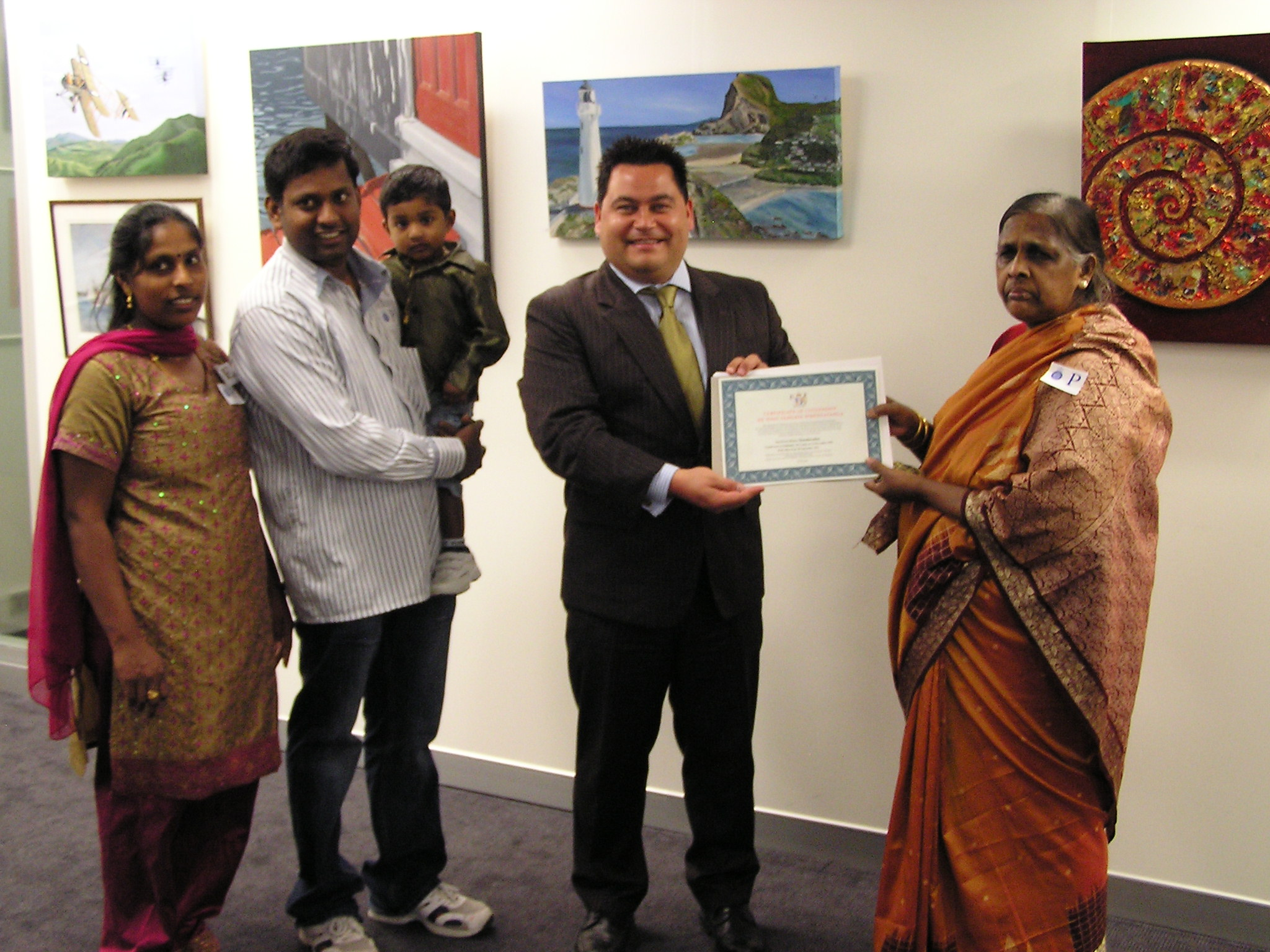
MP Charles Chauvel at a citizenship ceremony in Wellington

Foreigners may apply to become New Zealand citizens by grant if they meet certain criteria, such as being at least 16 years old and residing in the Realm for more than five years. They must be entitled to remain indefinitely, which usually means holding New Zealand permanent residency. Citizens and permanent residents of Australia also have indefinite permission to remain, as do permanent residents of the Cook Islands, Niue, and Tokelau. Applicants must demonstrate proficiency in English and be physically present in the country for at least 1,350 days during the five-year period, including at least 240 days in each year. Under exceptional circumstances, the physical presence requirement may be reduced to 450 days in a 20-month period. Candidates who are overseas on Crown service, or who accompany New Zealand citizen spouses on such service, are treated as if they are present in New Zealand during that period. The Minister of Internal Affairs may also grant citizenship to people who do not meet the criteria but have special circumstances.

Successful applicants aged 14 and older are required to take an oath or affirmation of citizenship in which they pledge loyalty to the New Zealand monarch; these oaths are usually administered by local councils at citizenship ceremonies that take place three to five months after approval.

There is no effective hierarchy or differentiation among the types of New Zealand citizenship. The only major disadvantage applies to citizens by descent, who cannot pass citizenship to their children born abroad. These individuals may apply to become citizens by grant after fulfilling the five-year residence and physical presence requirement. Otherwise, they may apply on behalf of their overseas-born children for citizenship by grant, at the discretion of the Minister of Internal Affairs. An average of 28,000 people per year were granted citizenship through the 2010s. As of the 2023 census, about 1.4 million New Zealand citizens usually resident in the country were born overseas.

Samoan citizens who enter New Zealand after 14 September 1982 and have indefinite permission to remain in the country are entitled to become New Zealand citizens by grant without a minimum residence requirement. Samoans who were already living in New Zealand on that date automatically became New Zealand citizens by grant. Children born in Samoa to Tokelauan mothers seeking medical attention there are treated as if they were born in Tokelau, and accordingly are New Zealand citizens at birth.

=== Relinquishment and deprivation ===
New Zealand citizenship can be relinquished by making a declaration of renunciation, provided that the declarant already possesses another nationality. Renunciation may be denied if the applicant currently lives in New Zealand or the country is at war. Citizenship may be involuntarily revoked from individuals who fraudulently acquired it, or from those who possess another nationality and have wilfully acted against the national interest.

== See also ==
- Visa policy of New Zealand
- Visa requirements for New Zealand citizens
