= Oath of Allegiance (New Zealand) =

The New Zealand Oath of Allegiance is defined by the Oaths and Declarations Act 1957. The Oath is required under New Zealand law to be made in certain circumstances, including as a requirement for individuals to hold certain offices, as well in judicial proceedings.

Since 2002, all Oaths can be taken in either Māori or English form. It is possible to take an affirmation, which has the same legal effect as an Oath.

== Oath of allegiance ==
The Oath, in its present form, is:

"I, [name], swear that I will be faithful and bear true allegiance to His Majesty King Charles the Third, His heirs and successors, according to law. So help me God."

In Māori, this is:

"Ko ahau, ko [ingoa] e oati ana ka noho pūmau taku pono ki a Kīngi Tiāre te Tuatoru me tōna kāhui whakaheke, e ai ki te ture. Ko te Atua nei hoki taku pou."

A modified version, with the added phrase "and I will obey the laws of New Zealand and fulfil my duties as a New Zealand citizen" is used as New Zealand's Oath of Citizenship.

== Affirmation ==
An affirmation begins with "I, [name], solemnly, sincerely, and truly declare and affirm", and continues with the words of the oath prescribed by law, omitting any reference to God.

== Other New Zealand Oaths ==
The chief justice administers the following oaths of office at the swearing-in of various government officials. For simplification, the oaths set out below take the form they would have if used today in English.

=== Governor-General's Oath ===
"I, [name], swear that, as Governor-General and Commander-in-Chief of the Realm of New Zealand, comprising New Zealand; the self-governing states of the Cook Islands and Niue; Tokelau; and the Ross Dependency, I will faithfully and impartially serve His Majesty King Charles the Third, King of New Zealand, His heirs and successors, and the people of the Realm of New Zealand, in accordance with their respective laws and customs. So help me God".

=== Executive Council Oath ===
"I, [name], being chosen and admitted of the Executive Council of New Zealand, swear that I will to the best of my judgement, at all times, when thereto required, freely give my counsel and advice to the Governor-General for the time being, for the good management of the affairs of New Zealand. That I will not directly nor indirectly reveal such matters as shall be debated in Council and committed to my secrecy, but that I will in all things be a true and faithful Councillor. So help me God".

=== House of Representatives Oath ===
The Constitution Act 1986 requires that, before being permitted to sit or vote in the House of Representatives, members of Parliament must take the Oath of Allegiance.

=== Parliamentary Under-Secretaries Oath ===
"I, [name], swear that I will well and truly serve His Majesty King Charles the Third, His heirs and successors, according to law, in the office of Parliamentary Under-Secretary. So help me God".

=== Judicial Oath ===
"I, [name], swear that I will well and truly serve His Majesty King Charles the Third, His heirs and successors, according to law, in the office of []; and I will do right to all manner of people after the laws and usages of New Zealand without fear or favour, affection or ill will. So help me God".

=== Armed forces Oath ===
"I, [name], solemnly promise and swear that I will be faithful and bear true allegiance to our Sovereign Lord the King, His heirs and successors, and that I will faithfully serve in the Royal New Zealand Naval Forces/the New Zealand Army/the Royal New Zealand Air Force [Delete the Services that are not appropriate], and that I will loyally observe and obey all orders of His Majesty, His heirs and successors, and of the officers set over me, until I shall be lawfully discharged. So help me God".

=== Police Oath ===
I, [name], swear that I will faithfully and diligently serve His Majesty [specify the name of the reigning Sovereign], King of New Zealand, his heirs and successors, without favour or affection, malice or ill-will. While a constable I will, to the best of my power, keep the peace and prevent offences against the peace, and will, to the best of my skill and knowledge, perform all the duties of the office of constable according to law. So help me God."

== Alteration and augmentation of oaths ==
The Oaths and Declarations Amendment Act 2002 inserted the right for the Oath to be taken in te reo Māori. The first member of Parliament to make their Oath in Māori was Dame Tariana Turia in 2004.

In May 2004, the Minister of Justice, Phil Goff, announced a review of New Zealand's oaths and affirmations stating: "This review also offers a chance for people to express a view on whether our oaths accurately reflect the values and beliefs that are important to New Zealanders in the 21st century". The Ministry of Justice reported in a discussion paper on oaths and affirmations that many were either out of date (such as the teachers' oath or the Queen's Counsel oath) or used arcane language. The review suggested that New Zealand could follow the experience of Australia by removing references to the Queen from the oaths. The Monarchist League called the change "republicanism by stealth" and commented that "[a] declaration of allegiance to New Zealand, or to the Prime Minister, would be a poor substitute [for the Queen]".

In response, the Republican Movement argued that removing references to the Queen was not "republicanism by stealth" but simply reflected the contemporary values of New Zealanders. The Republican Movement also submitted that "[t]he Australians have already updated their oath of citizenship so that there is no mention of the Queen, while maintaining the exact same constitutional monarchy as New Zealand".

To this day the oath remains, with relevant personnel (e.g. military) swearing allegiance to the King, either in a traditional oath or a non-religious affirmation.

=== Oaths Modernisation Bill ===
One year after the review was announced, Phil Goff released the new forms the oaths were to take. The references to the Queen were retained, and the Oaths Modernisation Bill was introduced in Parliament.

The Bill would have made the following changes:

- It amends the parliamentary oath to include loyalty to New Zealand and respect for the democratic values of New Zealand and respect for the rights and freedoms of its people;
- It amends the citizenship oath to include loyalty to New Zealand, and respect for the democratic values of New Zealand and respect for the rights and freedoms of its people;
- It provides a Māori version of each oath. The Act provides that using a Māori equivalent of any of the oaths set out in that Act shall have full legal effect;
- It amends the Act to prescribe a Māori language version of the words with which an affirmation must begin.

The Monarchist League was pleased with this outcome, stating, "While it may be questioned what 'loyalty to New Zealand', and 'respect for its democratic values' actually mean, it is heartening that no attempt was made to remove the oath of allegiance to the Queen." The Republican Movement stated that "[t]he best thing about the new oaths is that they can easily be changed when we become a republic".

After passing the first reading and going to the Government Administration Committee, the Bill had its second reading discharged on 1 June 2010, meaning it did not proceed.

=== Allegiance to the Treaty of Waitangi and Hone Harawira amendment ===
Several members of Parliament have attempted to swear allegiance to the Treaty of Waitangi rather than give the official Oath at their swearing-in. Māori Party MPs and Green MP Nándor Tánczos in 2005, Mana Movement MP Hone Harawira in 2011 and Te Pāti Māori MPs in 2023 notably made an unofficial alternative declaration of allegiance before completing the required official Oath or declaration.

In 2007, then Māori Party MP Hone Harawira put up an amendment (in the form of a supplementary order paper) to the Oaths Modernisation Bill inserting references to the oaths and affirmations to "uphold the Treaty of Waitangi". In 2023, Te Pāti Māori MPs used an alternative transliteration of King Charles (Kīngi Harehare rather than Kīngi Tiāre), which some critics claimed was offensive.

=== Other languages ===
The Oath or affirmation may be repeated unofficially in another language immediately after it is given in English or Te Reo Māori. A private member's bill in the name of Anahila Kanongata'a was debated in 2018; it proposed that members of Parliament may officially give their Oath in a non-English and non-Māori language. The bill failed at its first reading 54–65.

== See also ==
- Republicanism in New Zealand
- Oath of Allegiance
- Oath of Allegiance (United Kingdom)
- Oath of Allegiance (Australia)
- Oath of Allegiance (Canada)
