= Teanau Tuiono =

New Zealand politician

Teanau Tuiono MP
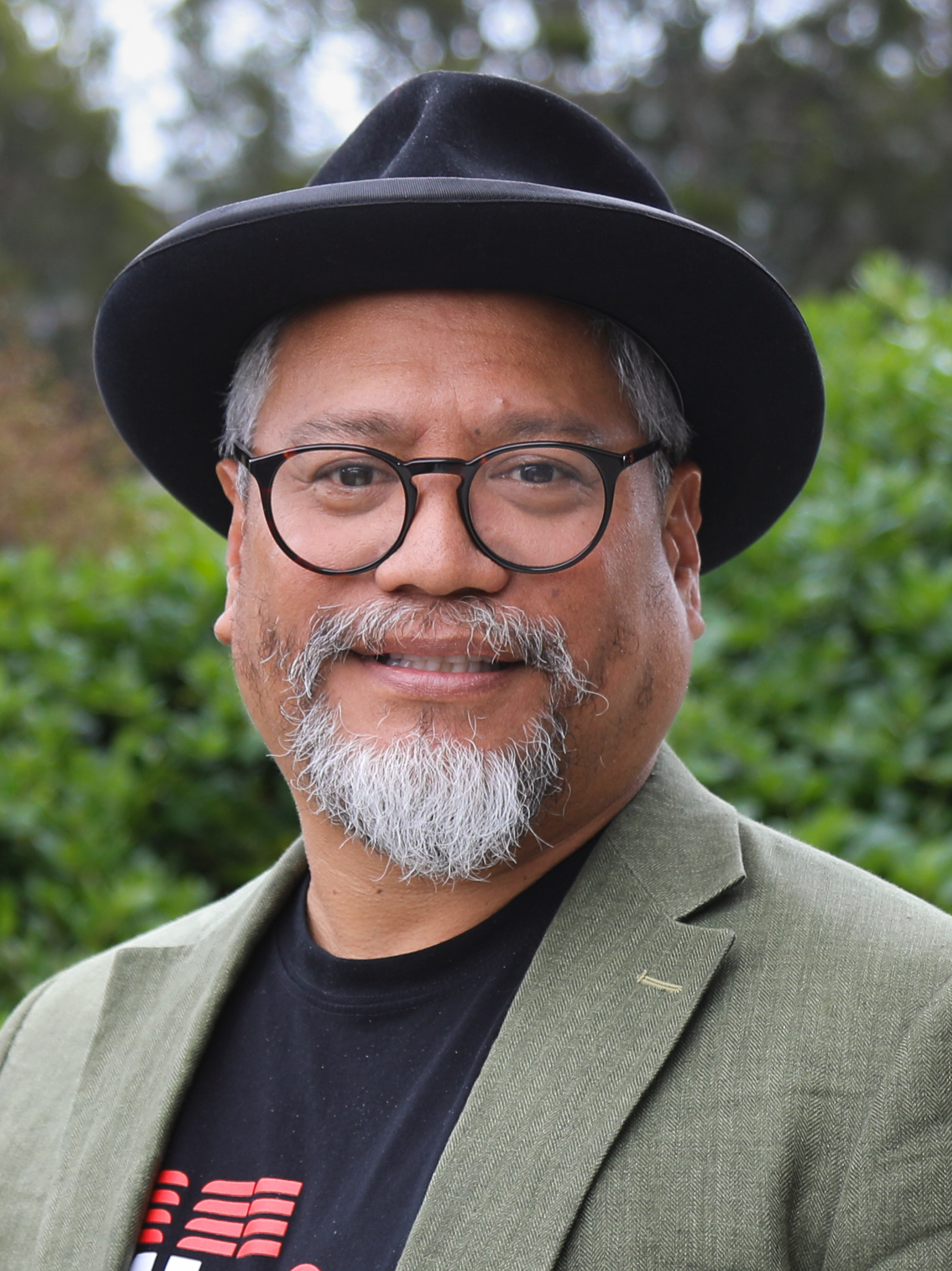
- Tuiono in 2026

Third Assistant Speaker of the House of Representatives
- Incumbent
- Assumed office 7 December 2023
- Preceded by: Office established

Member of the New Zealand Parliament for Green party list
- Incumbent
- Assumed office 17 October 2020

Personal details
- Born: 25 December 1972 (age 53) Auckland, New Zealand
- Party: Green
- Profession: Education Publisher
- Tuiono's voice recorded July 2024

Teanau Tuiono (born 25 December 1972) is a New Zealand politician. In 2020 he became a Member of Parliament in the House of Representatives as a representative of the Green Party of Aotearoa New Zealand.

== Early life and career ==
Tuiono was born in Henderson, West Auckland, New Zealand, on 25 December 1972. His mother Iris is a New Zealand Māori of the Ngāpuhi and Ngāi Takoto iwi from Northland, New Zealand. His father, also named Teanau, was Cook Islands Māori, born in Atiu. His grandfather, Teariki Tuiono, was a railways trade unionist and an Atiuan community leader in Auckland. Tuiono is tangata whenua, and also belongs to the Pasifika/Moananui diaspora. He grew up in Te Atatū and Ōtāhuhu, with a two-year period in Rarotonga. He initially enrolled for an engineering certificate but partway through changed to a BA in Māori Studies at the University of Auckland. He credits an environmental paper he took there, taught by Jeanette Fitzsimons, as turning him into environmental activism. He followed his BA with a law degree, also from the University of Auckland.

By profession, Tuiono is an education consultant who has previously worked at both the United Nations and was the activist in residence at Massey University.

Tuiono attended the protests at the anti-Springbok tour protests in 1981. Prior to entering parliament, he organised protests for subjects such as GCSB laws, the TPPA, and support for Australian Aboriginal rights. He was also involved in translating Facebook into Māori. In 2021, during a debate on new anti-terrorism laws he recalled how his home had been raided by police during the 2007 New Zealand police raids.

== Political career ==
New Zealand Parliament
Years	Term	Electorate	List	Party
2020–2023	53rd	List	8	Green
2023–2026	54th	List	5	Green
2026–present	55th	List	3	Green

=== Early political campaigns ===
Tuiono stood for the Green Party at the 2017 election and was 16th on the party list. This was not high enough for Tuiono to be elected to parliament, as the party won only 8 seats.

At the 2019 local-body elections, Tuiono stood for Mayor of Palmerston North as the Green Party candidate, running a campaign focusing on the local effects of climate change. He finished a distant second to incumbent Grant Smith.

=== First term, 2020–2023 ===
During the 2020 general election, Tuiono stood as the 8th ranked list candidate for the Green Party and as the party's candidate for Palmerston North. He came third place in Palmerston North, with 2,039 votes. With the Greens winning 10 seats, he became a list Member of Parliament. Tuiono is the Green Party's first Pasifika MP.

During his campaign, Tuiono pledged to tackle wealth inequality in New Zealand.

=== Second term, 2023–2026 ===
During the 2023 New Zealand general election, Tuiono was re-elected to Parliament on the Greens' party list.

In late November 2023, Tuiono assumed the Green Party's Pacific Region, education, workplace relations and safety, space, national security and intelligence, and overseas development assistance spokesperson portfolios.

On 7 December 2023, Tuiono was appointed as the third assistant speaker, the first Green Party MP to become a member on the speaker team and the second MP, after Peter Hilt in 1996, from a party other than National or Labour to become an assistant speaker.

On 10 April 2024, Tuiono's member's bill "Citizenship (Western Samoa) (Restoration) Amendment Bill" passed its first reading with the support of the opposition Green, Labour, Te Pāti Māori and the government coalition parties ACT and New Zealand First. The bill proposes restoring citizenship eligibility to a group of older Samoans born between 1924 and 1949 when Samoa was still a New Zealand mandate territory. The bill passed its second reading on 25 October, with the National party changing their position to support it after over 24,000 submissions were made during the select committee process. On 20 November, the bill passed its third reading with unanimous support.

In early February 2026, Tuiono lodged a member's bill called the Tohorā Oranga Bill, which seeks to grant legal personhood to whales.

On 18 February 2026, New Zealand First leader Winston Peters twice criticised Tuiono for referring to New Zealand by its Māori name "Aotearoa" while asking about New Zealand's climate aid in the Pacific during parliamentary question time. Peters questioned why someone "who comes from Rarotonga" had decided to change New Zealand's name. In response, Labour leader Chris Hipkins accused Peters of racism against Tuiono, while House Speaker Gerry Brownlee said Peters' question was unacceptable in the House.

=== Third term, 2026–present ===
During the 2026 New Zealand general election, Tuiono was ranked third on the Green Party list. He contested the Palmerston North electorate. Based on preliminary results, Tuiono came third place in the Palmerston North contest, gaining 2,447 votes on 7 November. He was re-elected to Parliament on the Green Party list.

== Views and positions ==
In December 2020, Tuiono joined fellow Green MP Golriz Ghahraman and Labour MP Ibrahim Omer in pledging to form a new parliamentary Palestine friendship group to "raise the voices of Palestinian peoples in the New Zealand Parliament" during an event organised by the Wellington Palestine advocacy group to mark the International Day of Solidarity with the Palestinian people.

Tuiono serves as his party's agriculture spokesperson. He supports regenerative agriculture and a move away from intensive dairy farming.

He considers it appropriate for MPs to be able to pledge allegiance to Te Tiriti O Waitangi instead of to the King.
