= Visa policy of Australia =

Policy on permits required to enter Australia and its external territories

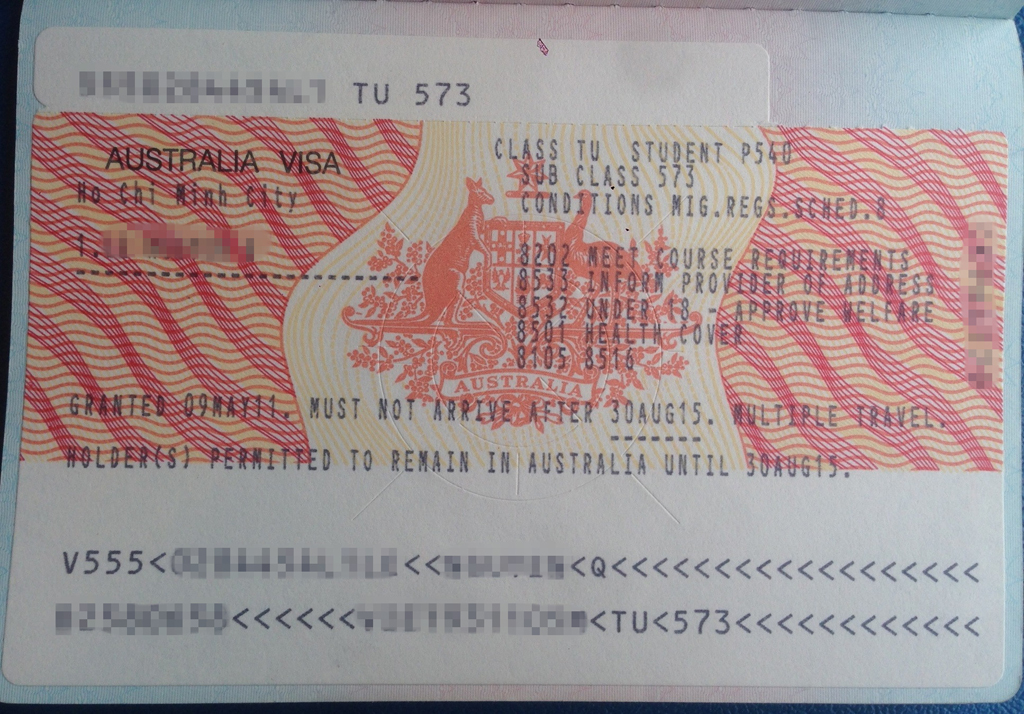
Visa label, no longer issued. All visas are now issued electronically.

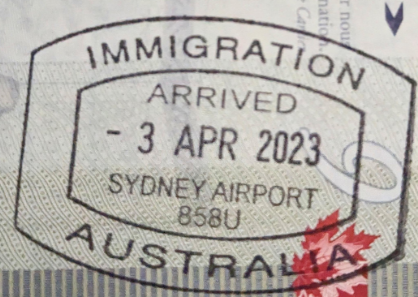
Entry stamp, now issued only on request

The visa policy of Australia comprises the legislative and regulatory framework governing the entry of foreign nationals into Australia, and specifies the requirements for obtaining a visa, which authorises travel to, entry into, and stay in the country. A visa may also confer additional privileges, such as the right to work or study, and may be subject to conditions.

Since 1994, Australia has maintained a universal visa regime, under which every non-citizen present in Australia must hold a valid visa, whether obtained through an application or granted automatically by law. Australia does not operate a visa-on-arrival system, except that eligible New Zealand citizens are granted a Special Category Visa (subclass 444) on arrival pursuant to the Trans-Tasman Travel Arrangement. Visitors holding passports from certain countries may obtain visas through streamlined processes:

- New Zealand citizens using a valid New Zealand passport are granted a Special Category Visa (subclass 444) on arrival pursuant to the Trans-Tasman Travel Arrangement. No application form or visa application charge is required.
- Nationals of 36 countries, comprising the 27 EU member states, the four EFTA member states, the United Kingdom, and four European microstates, may apply for an eVisitor visa (subclass 651) online without a visa application charge.
- Nationals from 34 countries and territories may apply for an Electronic Travel Authority (subclass 601) using the Australian ETA mobile application upon payment of a service charge.

Under the Migration Regulations 1994, certain persons are taken to hold a valid visa without applying through the standard Australian visa process, including certain visitors, principally those connected with foreign governments or armed forces, who qualify for entry under the special purpose visa provisions established under the Migration Act 1958 and related regulations.

Nationals of all other countries must apply for a visa before travelling to Australia.

Since 1 September 2015, Australia has ceased issuing visa labels as evidence of visa status, with all visas issued and recorded electronically. Visa holders can access their visa records and conditions through Visa Entitlement Verification Online (VEVO), a digital verification service provided by the Department of Home Affairs.

== Visa policy map ==
Visa policy of Australia Australia Special Category Visa eVisitor or Electronic Travel Authority eVisitor Electronic Travel Authority Online Visa

== History ==
Visa formats in Australia have changed over the years. Australia was possibly one of the first countries to replace ink-based stamps with more secure stick-on labels in the 1970s.

In 1987, the then-Department of Immigration and Ethnic Affairs initiated a scheme which saw the utilization of computers to process visitor visa applications in overseas Australian missions for the first time.

In 1990, a second generation of the Immigration Records and Information System (IRIS II) was introduced as a replacement of the original 1987 scheme. At the time, IRIS II was the most advanced visa processing system in the world, simplifying immigration clearance processes at airports and enabling across-the-counter visa issue at the Australian diplomatic missions. This resulted in the rollout and use of a simplified generic 'Arrival' stamp for all arrivals - citizens or non-citizens by September 1990. This same general design is in use today, albeit by request only.

In 1996, the Electronic Travel Authority system (ETA) was launched. The system allows visas to be issued electronically and linked to the applicant's passport, eliminating paper application forms. Australia was the first country in the world to launch electronic visas.

By 1997, the Department of Immigration and Ethnic Affairs became known simply as the Department of Immigration, and this resulted in a slight design change of the departure stamp which would ready 'Immigration Australia' instead of 'Immigration and Ethnic Affairs'.

By 1998, a new smaller arrival and departure card format was introduced and simultaneously the cessation of stamping these documents once processed by an officer also ceased.

In 2012 the Department of Immigration put out a notice on their website that they were going to trial the cessation of stamping passports on departure from Australia. Legislation was required to be changed first and this then resulted in the move becoming permanent by 2013. This resulted in the removal of stamps from the front line desks, However, the website has always stated you can always request one if evidence of travel is required from a Border Officer (typically at a secondary desk). This was all in-line with the rollout of Automated Border processing gates.

Australia officially ceased the issuance of visa stickers on 1 September 2015, and all visas are issued and recorded electronically.

2016 was the last year in which foreign passports were automatically stamped on arrival. This resulted in the removal of stamps from the front line desks bringing this into line with the similar moves regarding stamping passports on departure in 2013. However, the website has always stated you can always request one if evidence of travel is required from a Border Officer (typically at a secondary desk). This was all in-line with the rollout of Automated Border processing gates.

From July 2017, the use of outgoing departure cards ceased. Passengers were previously required to complete paper declarations upon departing Australia. Instead, the same information is now sourced automatically through electronic systems.

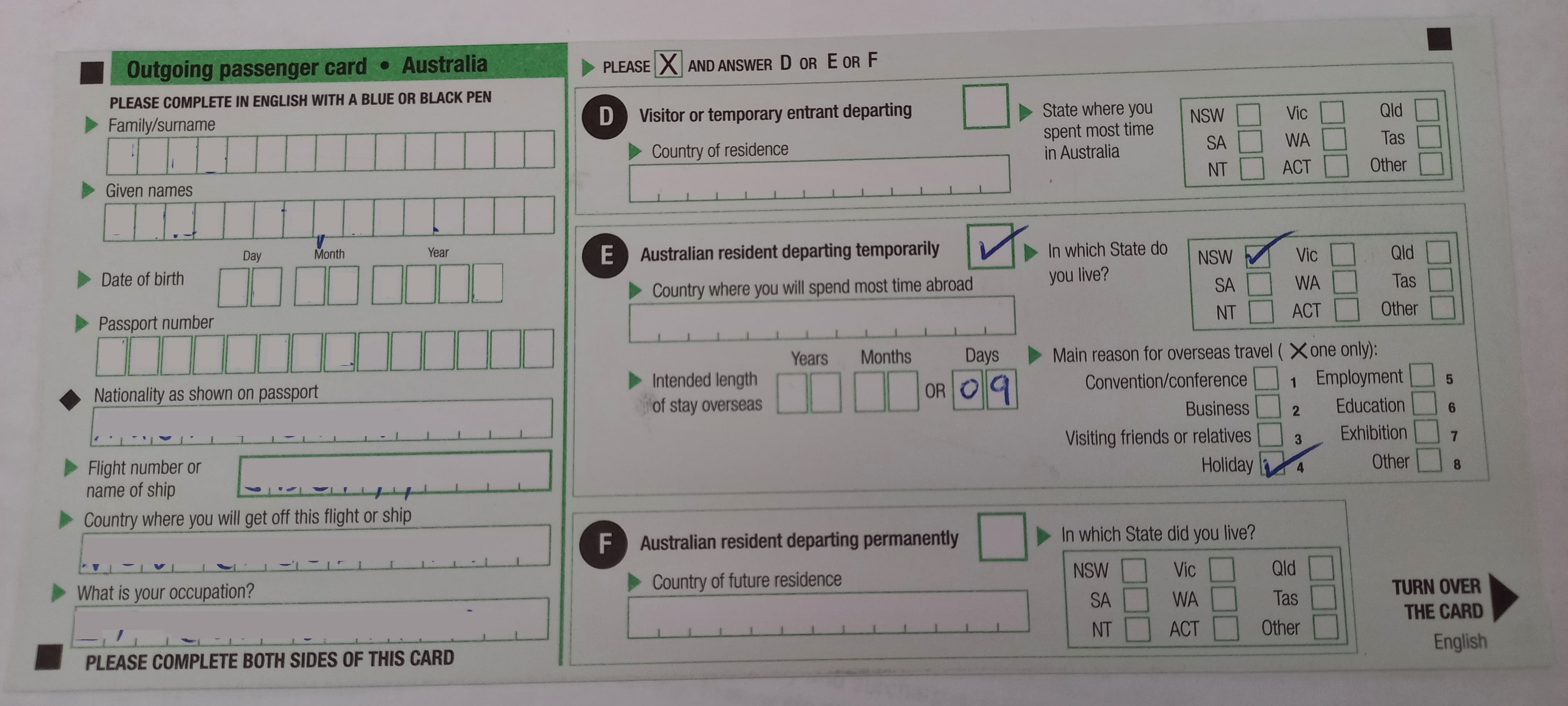
The Departure card - used from the 1960s until July 2017

By the end of 2017, all wet-ink passport stamping had ceased as a matter of course at the primary line for arrivals and departures at staffed counters. Evidence of travel stamps can still be requested at a secondary staffed counter typically immediately after the primary line (including if you have used SmartGate for automated passport processing).

Physical arrival cards were replaced with a Digital Passenger Declaration mobile phone app in February 2022. In July 2022 physical paper cards were brought back and the app was scrapped due to poor user experience and difficulties it created for the travellers who were unable to use a suitable electronic device.

== Legal authority ==
Visa rules are set out in the Migration Act 1958 and the Migration Regulations, which are administered by the Department of Home Affairs.

== Visa exemption ==
=== Special purpose visa ===
A special purpose visa is a visa exemption given by operation of law to certain foreign nationals in Australia to whom standard visa and immigration clearance arrangements do not apply. It effectively exempts certain persons from the normal processes for entry into Australia. These include members of the Royal Family and the members of the Royal party, guests of Government, Status of forces agreement forces members including civilian component members, Asia‑Pacific forces members, Commonwealth forces members, foreign armed forces dependents, foreign naval forces members, airline positioning crew members and airline crew members, eligible transit passengers, persons visiting Macquarie Island, eligible children born in Australia and Indonesian traditional fishermen visiting the Territory of Ashmore and Cartier Islands.

=== Transit without a visa ===
Some travellers do not need a Transit visa (subclass 771) if they depart Australia by air within 8 hours of the scheduled time of their arrival, hold confirmed onward booking and documentation necessary to enter the country of their destination and remain in the transit lounge at an airport (i.e. they do not need to clear immigration in order to re-check their luggage).

Holders of passports of the following countries can transit without a visa:

- All European Union member states
- All European Free Trade Association member states

- Andorra
- Argentina
- Brunei
- Canada
- Chile
- Fiji
- Hong Kong (Note: Holders of Hong Kong Special Administrative Region passports.)
- Indonesia
- Japan
- Kiribati
- Malaysia
- Marshall Islands
- Mexico
- Micronesia
- Monaco
- Nauru
- New Zealand
- Oman
- Palau
- Papua New Guinea
- Philippines
- Qatar
- Samoa
- San Marino
- Singapore
- Solomon Islands
- South Africa
- South Korea
- Taiwan (Note: Except holders of diplomatic or official passports.)
- Thailand
- Tonga
- Tuvalu
- United Arab Emirates
- United Kingdom (Note: Including all classes of British nationality.)
- United States
- Uruguay
- Vanuatu
- Vatican City

- Holders of diplomatic passports, except nationals of Afghanistan, Algeria, Angola, Bahrain, Comoros, Egypt, Iran, Iraq, Jordan, Kuwait, Lebanon, Libya, Madagascar, Mauritania, Morocco, North Korea, Pakistan, Russia, Saudi Arabia, Sierra Leone, Somalia, Sudan, Syria, Taiwan, Tunisia, Yemen, Zimbabwe, and Arab Non-National Passport Holders (ANNPH).

A Transit visa is required for Gold Coast airport, and for Cairns airport and Sydney airport if staying overnight. Transit without a visa through Adelaide applies only to passengers departing on the same aircraft unless advance notice is given by the airline. In addition, those who need to leave the transit lounge for any reason must hold a valid Australian visa.

=== Torres Strait ===
Residents of thirteen coastal villages in Papua New Guinea are permitted to enter the 'Protected Zone' of the Torres Strait (part of Queensland) for traditional purposes. This exemption from passport control is part of a treaty between Australia and Papua New Guinea negotiated when PNG became independent from Australia in 1975. Full list was determined in 2000 and includes the following 13 villages – Bula, Mari, Jarai, Tais, Buji/Ber, Sigabadaru, Mabadauan, Old Mawatta, Ture Ture, Kadawa, Katatai, Parama and Sui. They can make traditional visits (free movement without passports) as far as 10 degrees 30 minutes South latitude (near Number One Reef). Australian traditional inhabitants come from the following villages – Badu, Boigu, Poruma (Coconut Island), Erub (Darnley Island), Dauan, Kubin, St Pauls, Mabuiag, Mer (Murray Island), Saibai, Ugar (Stephen Island), Warraber (Sue Island), Iama (Yam Island) and Masig (Yorke Island). They can make traditional visits to the Papua New Guinea Treaty Villages and travel north as far as the 9 degrees South latitude (just north of Daru). Vessels from other parts of Papua New Guinea and other countries attempting to cross into Australia or Australian waters are stopped by the Australian Border Force (ABF) or the Royal Australian Navy.

== Online Visa ==
All Australian visas are electronic visas since 2015, with details stored only in the Australian immigration database. Visa details are electronically linked to passport details. Physical labels or stamps are no longer needed. Nearly all Australian visas can be applied for online.

Short-term travellers with certain passports benefit from reciprocal visa waiver agreements with Australia. These travellers still technically require a visa but obtain them through a streamlined online process, when staying for 3 months or less. Eligible visitors apply online for an Electronic Travel Authority (ETA) or eVisitor visa depending on their nationality. Visitors eligible for an ETA may also apply through some travel agents, airlines and specialist service providers. Many applications are granted in minutes, whereas others require further checking of information.

=== eVisitor (subclass 651) ===
The eVisitor was introduced on 27 October 2008, replacing an older eVisa system, to create a reciprocal short stay travel arrangement for nationals of Australia and the European Union, while still maintaining the universal visa system. On 23 March 2013 the business and tourist purpose eVisitors visas were merged into a single application.

The eVisitor is issued free of charge and allows the holder to visit Australia for unlimited times, up to 3 months per visit, in a 12-month period for tourism or business purposes. Applicants must also satisfy the health and character requirements as for other visas.

Holders of passports of the following countries may apply for eVisitor:

- All European Union member states
- All European Free Trade Association member states
- Andorra
- Monaco
- San Marino
- United Kingdom (Note: Only British citizens are eligible to apply for eVisitor.)
- Vatican City

The grant rate of eVisitor has been consistently high over the years, never dropping below 98.5%. In the second quarter of 2026 the lowest approval rates for tourism applications were for the nationals of Romania (82.1%), Lithuania (88.6%) with all other countries having a grant rate above 95% in 2026. There is still a major difference in approval rates between these 2 countries and the rest even 10 years after the European Commission was notified.

The European Commission ruled that the eVisitor's 'autogrant' treatment is not an equivalent to the Schengen visa application procedures. Applications for countries deemed high risk, i.e. not ETA, are routinely processed manually rather than via 'autogrant' and they are subject to additional documents prior to arrival, which is typical for a proper visa.

Australia's SmartGate entry system for automatically processing through passport control at the time of introduction could only be used for countries on ETA list, not by countries on eVisitor list. According to HPI (Henley Passport Index) methodology pre-departure government approval, like eVisitor manual processing is not considered as visa free.

In 2018, the European Union planned to introduce their own electronic travel authorisation, called ETIAS, needed for visa-exempt countries like Australia.

==== History ====
The eVisitor in the last quarter of 2013 was granted automatically to 85.8% of applicants but the rates differed significantly among countries. The lowest automatically granted rates in the 4th quarter were for nationals of Bulgaria (16.2%), Romania (18.3%), Czech Republic (58.6%), Lithuania (59.3%), Latvia (62.4%) and Slovakia (66.3%) with all other countries having an automatic grant rate above 70%.

In 2014, Bulgaria, Cyprus and Romania notified the European Commission that they considered that Australia required a visa for their nationals. The notification was dismissed in 2015 after Australia lifted a transit visa requirement for Bulgarians, Cypriots and Romanians and made some clarifications.

=== Electronic Travel Authority (ETA) (subclass 601) ===
Development of the ETA system commenced in January 1996. It was first implemented in Singapore on a trial basis on 11 September 1996, for holders of Singapore and US passports travelling on Qantas and Singapore Airlines. Implementation of online applications began in June 2001. The current ETA came into effect on 23 March 2013 replacing older ETAs (subclass 976, 977 and 956) while offering a single authorization for both tourist and business purposes.

The ETA allows the holder to visit Australia for unlimited times, up to 3 months per visit, in a 12-month period for tourism or business purposes. The application requires a service charge of A$20. Applicants must also satisfy the health and character requirements as for other visas.

Holders of passports of the following countries and territories may apply for an ETA:

- Brunei
- Canada
- Hong Kong (Note: Holders of Hong Kong Special Administrative Region passports.)
- Japan
- Malaysia
- Singapore
- South Korea
- Taiwan (Note: Except holders of diplomatic or official passports.)
- United States

Holders of passports of certain countries eligible for eVisitor may also apply for an ETA:

- Andorra
- Austria
- Belgium
- Denmark
- Finland
- France
- Germany
- Greece
- Iceland
- Ireland
- Italy
- Liechtenstein
- Luxembourg
- Malta
- Monaco
- Netherlands
- Norway
- Portugal
- San Marino
- Spain
- Sweden
- Switzerland
- United Kingdom (Note: Only British citizens and British Nationals (Overseas) are eligible to apply for an ETA.)
- Vatican City

In recent years, reports have surfaced that Malaysian nationals are being screened more carefully, with some applicants required to submit additional documents, such as bank statements and proof of employment or to show ties to their country of origin. The ETA may not be granted within 72 hours in these cases.

=== Online Visitor visa (600) ===
Since November 2012, visa labels in passport have not been required, but were issued at a request for a fee. As of September 2015 the possibility to obtain a visa label is no longer available and records are accessible only online through the Visa Entitlement Verification Online (VEVO) service.

On 23 March 2013, a new Visitor visa (subclass 600) replaced the previous Tourist visa (subclass 676).

Some applicants may receive a letter requiring them to provide biometrics at a visa center.

In the 4th quarter of 2013 the automatic grant rate for electronically lodged applications outside Australia stood at 28.3%. Previously the rate ranged from 20.4% to 63.2%.

== Visa types ==
There is a large range of visas that may be applied for, for a variety of purposes, including:

=== Holiday/visitor visas ===
As of August 2025 there are six types of holiday visas. These include:

- Visitor visa – for people who need to come to Australia for a short duration for tourism or business purposes. They are issued for periods up to three, six, or twelve months. Eligible Chinese Citizens can be issued 10-year visa as of 2017 only when applying from China. Eligible Citizens of Timor-Leste and all ASEAN Countries can be issued 10-year visa as of 2024.
- Working holiday visa (subclass 417) (Note: Must be applied for outside Australia.) – for people 18 to 30 years of age, who are interested to have an extended holiday while supplementing their funds with short-term work of up to 12 months (with a maximum of 6 months with one employer) and who come from Belgium, Canada, Cyprus, Denmark, Estonia, Finland, France, Germany, Hong Kong, Ireland, Italy, Japan, Malta, Netherlands, Norway, South Korea, Sweden, Taiwan or the United Kingdom.
- Work and holiday visa (subclass 462) – for people 18 to 30 years of age, who are interested to have an extended holiday while supplementing their funds with short-term work of up to 12 months (with a maximum of 6 months with one employer) and who come from Argentina, Bangladesh, Brazil, Chile, China, Czech Republic, Indonesia, Malaysia, Peru, Poland, Portugal, Slovakia, Slovenia, Spain, Thailand, Turkey, the US, Uruguay or Vietnam.
- Transit visa (subclass 771) – for people who wish to transit through Australia for less than 72 hours and who do not qualify for transit without a visa or people travelling to Australia to join a vessel as crew.

=== Indefinite and permanent visas ===
- Permanent residency visa – authorises the permanent resident to remain in Australia indefinitely and to work, as well as many other benefits such medical health coverage under Medicare.
- Resident Return Visa (RRV) (subclasses 155 and 157) – allows current and former permanent residents to travel to another country and re-enter the Australian migration zone as a permanent resident. RRVs allow the holder to re-enter Australia as often as they wish during the validity of the visa. RRVs may be issued with five years' or three months' validity.
- Special Category Visa (subclass 444) – issued under the Trans-Tasman Travel Arrangement to citizens of New Zealand who present a valid New Zealand passport and authorises the holder to enter Australia, live and work indefinitely. The visa is subject to the following conditions: no criminal convictions, no untreated tuberculosis and have not been deported, excluded or removed from any country. The visa is given on arrival at any Australian port, unless they already hold another type of Australian visa.

=== Working and skilled visas ===
As of August 2025 there is a large number of types types of visas for skilled workers.

=== Study visas ===
As of August 2025 there are three types of student and training visas:

- Student visa (subclass 500)
- Student Guardian visa (subclass 590)
- Training visa (subclass 407)

The Student visa (subclass 500) (Note: May be applied for in or outside Australia.) is for people to study full-time in a recognised education institution. This single type of visa replaced student visas with subclass numbers 570 to 576 on 1 July 2016.

=== Bridging visas ===
Bridging visas are temporary visas. They do not confer permanent residency. As of August 2025, bridging visas may be applied for and granted in the following categories:

- Bridging visa A – BVA - (subclass 010): permits the applicant to stay in Australia after their current substantive visa ceases and while their new substantive visa application is being processed; may be allowed to work
- Bridging visa B – BVB – (subclass 020): permits the applicant to leave and return to Australia during a specified travel period while their application for a substantive visa is being processed; may be allowed to work
- Bridging visa C – BVC – (subclass 030): generally permits the applicant to stay in Australia after their current substantive visa ceases and while their new substantive visa application is being processed; may be allowed to work
- Bridging visa E – BVE – (subclass 050 and 051): permits the applicant to stay lawfully in Australia while making arrangements to leave, finalise their immigration matter, or wait for an immigration decision

=== Refugee and humanitarian visas ===
As of August 2025 there are seven types of refugee and humanitarian visas.

- Global Special Humanitarian (subclass 202)
- Protection visa (subclass 866)
- Refugee visas (subclass 200, 201, 203 and 204)
- Temporary Protection visa (subclass 785)
- Safe Haven Enterprise visa (subclass 790)
- Resolution of Status visa (subclass 851)

=== Norfolk Island visas ===
- Special categories for residents of Norfolk Island:
  On 1 July 2016, Norfolk Island became a part of the Australian migration zone. All Norfolk Island immigration permits are no longer valid. Instead, its non-citizen residents are accorded the following categories of visa depending on their previous status (except for New Zealand citizens who were automatically given the Special Category Visa):
  - Provisional Resident Return visa (subclass 159) – issued to former holders of Norfolk Island immigration permits (Temporary Entry Permit (TEP) or General Entry Permit (GEP)). Holders of this visa may live and work on Norfolk Island and live in other parts of Australia only for education purposes. They may apply for the Confirmatory (Residence) visa after they meet the residence requirements on Norfolk Island.
  - Confirmatory (Residence) visa (subclass 808) – issued to former holders of Norfolk Island immigration permits who were either holding an unrestricted entry permit (UEP) or who held a TEP or GEP and have fulfilled the residence requirements. Holders of this type of visa are Australian permanent residents and may live and work in Australia indefinitely, and they may freely leave and enter Australia within the visa's validity (same with the Resident Return visa). This type of visa replaced the UEP, and the Permanent Resident of Norfolk Island visa (PRNIV) which was issued to permanent residents of Norfolk Island at an Australian airport.

=== Other types of visa ===
- Partner, Fiancé and Family Members visa – for family members (partners, parents or children) of Australian citizens or permanent residents or of eligible New Zealand citizens. There is a large number in this group of visas, including Provisional Partner visa (subclass 309 and subclass 820) and Migrant Partner visa (subclass 100 and subclass 801), Fiancé, Prospective Marriage visa (subclass 300). Family Member visas including Child, Parent, Aged dependant relative, Remaining relative and Carer.
- Medical treatment (subclass 602) – for people to have medical treatment or medical consultations, donate an organ or support the person who is having medical treatment in Australia but not to have medical treatment for surrogate motherhood.

As of August 2025 other types of visa include:

- Crew Travel Authority visa (subclass 942)
- Former Resident visa (subclass 151)
- Maritime Crew visa (subclass 988)
- Resident Return visa (subclass 155 157)
- Special Category visa (subclass 444)
- Special Purpose visa
- Investor Retirement visa (subclass 405)

=== Ex-citizens ===
- Ex-citizen visa – issued under section 35 of the Migration Act 1958 to persons whose Australian citizenship has been cancelled while physically within the Australian migration zone. According to a 2015 explanatory blog post by the Parliamentary Library, an effect of the then-unpassed Australian Citizenship Amendment (Allegiance to Australia) Bill 2015 would be that a person would not need be told that they have lost Australian citizenship, nor that they instead hold this visa by operation of law, entitling the visa holder to remain permanently in Australia. However, the visa would cease to have effect when the person left Australia, and to re-enter they would need a Resident Return Visa or other permanent visa. When leaving the country they might not be aware that they hold this visa, and may have difficulties returning.

== External territories ==
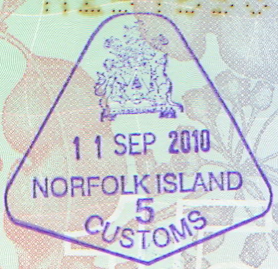
Norfolk Island passport stamp

- Australian Antarctic Territory – an environmental authorisation must be obtained, based on an environmental impact assessment (EIA) submitted by the organiser of the activity. In some cases, where an activity organised in another country party to the Treaty and Protocol, Australia will recognise an authorisation provided by that country. As well as an environmental authorisation, permits are required for certain activities.
- Christmas Island – Passports and visas are not required when travelling from the Australian mainland. However, photographic identification must be produced for clearance through Customs and Immigration. Normal Australian Customs and Immigration procedures apply when entry is made from outside Australia.
- Cocos (Keeling) Islands – Passports and visas are not required when travelling from the Australian mainland. However, photographic identification must be produced for clearance through Customs and Immigration. Normal Australian Customs and Immigration procedures apply when entry is made from outside Australia.
- Heard Island and McDonald Islands – a permit to enter and undertake activities in the Territory of Heard Island and McDonald Islands is required and is issued by the Australian Antarctic Division.
- Macquarie Island – a written authorisation of the Director of National Parks and Wildlife is required.
- Norfolk Island – From 1 July 2016 all movements between Norfolk Island and Australian mainland are considered as domestic movements, however all passengers are still required to carry passports or, for Australian citizens, some type of photographic identification and pass Customs and Immigration. Normal Australian Customs and Immigration procedures apply when entry is made from outside Australia. Passengers not carrying their passports are not eligible to purchase duty-free goods on Norfolk Island.

== SmartGate ==
SmartGate is an automated border processing system introduced by the Australian Border Force. The SmartGate is available to all holders of an electronic passport who are at least 1.1 m tall and are of age 16 years or older (or at least 7 years of age when traveling with a parent or legal guardian).

== APEC Business Travel Card ==
Holders of passports issued by the following countries who possess an APEC Business Travel Card (ABTC) containing the "AUS" code on the reverse that it is valid for travel to Australia can enter visa-free for business trips for up to 90 days.

ABTCs are issued to nationals of:

- Brunei
- Chile
- China
- Hong Kong
- Indonesia
- Japan
- Malaysia
- Mexico
- New Zealand
- Papua New Guinea
- Peru
- Philippines
- Russia
- Singapore
- South Korea
- Taiwan
- Thailand
- Vietnam

== Temporary entrants statistics ==
The number of temporary entrants and New Zealand citizens physically present in Australia is estimated every three months by identifying those who have entered Australia and those who have neither left nor granted permanent residency.

Temporary visa holders	30 September 2014	30 September 2015	% Change	% of total
New Zealand (Special Category 444) visa	657,210	661,550	0.7	35.4
Student visa	387,800	425,740	9.8	22.8
Visitor visa	226,010	258,910	14.6	13.8
Temporary Skilled visa	196,930	186,810	-5.1	10.0
Working Holiday Maker visa	151,220	144,450	-4.5	7.7
Bridging visa	94,840	114,390	20.6	6.1
Other Temporary visa	47,210	52,190	10.5	2.8
Temporary Graduate visa	21,970	25,520	16.2	1.4
Total visa	1,783,190	1,869,550	4.8	100

== Overstaying visa ==
Foreign nationals who remain in Australia after their visa has expired are termed overstayers. Official government sources put the number of visa overstayers in Australia at approximately 50,000. This has been the official number of illegal immigrants for about 25 years and is considered to be low. Other sources have placed it at up to 100,000, but no detailed study has been completed to quantify this number, which could be significantly higher.

The government calculates a "Modified Non-Return Rate" of the people who arrive on a Visitor visa granted outside Australia, but do not depart before their visa expires. It is considered when assessing visa applications as an indicator of Visitor visa compliance.

Nationality	2010–11	2011–12	2012–13
Afghanistan	18.23	19.02	8.06
Albania	5.86	7.14	3.76
Algeria	1.03	0.91	0.82
Andorra	6.79	0.00	0.00
Angola	0.00	0.00	0.00
Antigua and Barbuda	0.00	0.00	0.00
Argentina	0.66	0.53	0.47
Armenia	3.80	1.63	4.84
Austria	0.44	0.45	0.34
Azerbaijan	0.00	0.94	0.81
Bahamas	1.82	1.47	1.96
Bahrain	4.95	6.19	5.23
Bangladesh	1.60	1.15	2.09
Barbados	0.00	0.00	0.00
Belarus	0.71	0.25	0.48
Belgium	0.45	0.53	0.34
Belize	0.00	0.00	2.86
Benin	5.88	10.53	0.00
Bermuda	0.00	0.00	12.50
Bhutan	0.76	1.50	2.42
Bolivia	0.79	5.17	2.37
Bosnia and Herzegovina	0.98	0.85	1.27
Botswana	1.48	1.53	1.32
Brazil	0.91	0.65	0.87
British protected person	0.00	N/A	0.00
Brunei	0.74	0.35	0.62
Bulgaria	3.73	3.97	4.61
Burkina Faso	4.18	0.00	0.00
Burundi	16.67	16.13	0.00
Cambodia	1.95	4.95	2.03
Cameroon	9.47	1.89	1.30
Canada	0.88	0.92	0.66
Cape Verde	0.00	0.00	0.00
Cayman Islands	0.00	0.00	N/A
Central African Republic	N/A	0.00	0.00
Chad	0.00	0.00	0.00
Chile	1.18	0.81	0.66
China	0.39	0.32	0.29
Colombia	1.15	1.44	1.71
Comoros	0.00	0.00	0.00
Congo	0.00	3.28	5.26
Costa Rica	1.96	0.50	0.85
Croatia	0.48	0.98	2.19
Cuba	3.37	4.88	2.22
Cyprus	1.28	2.00	2.28
Czech Republic	0.77	0.85	0.85
Democratic Republic of the Congo	2.99	5.33	7.27
Denmark	0.36	0.47	0.26
Djibouti	0.00	16.67	0.00
Dominica	0.00	0.00	0.00
Dominican Republic	3.85	1.30	0.85
East Timor	0.59	1.53	2.76
Ecuador	2.39	0.99	0.73
Egypt	6.37	9.23	15.20
El Salvador	6.01	3.67	1.17
Equatorial Guinea	0.00	0.00	0.00
Eritrea	28.89	10.51	15.91
Estonia	2.66	3.89	3.87
Ethiopia	9.24	10.92	12.23
Fiji	2.34	2.09	1.60
Finland	0.40	0.52	0.36
France	0.52	0.58	0.43
Gabon	0.00	0.00	0.00
Gambia	0.00	0.00	0.00
Georgia	4.55	15.89	10.45
Germany	0.48	0.47	0.36
Ghana	3.57	3.46	4.03
Greece	3.99	8.40	7.97
Grenada	0.00	0.00	0.00
Guatemala	1.13	1.39	4.20
Guinea	0.00	2.17	9.76
Guinea-Bissau	0.00	0.00	0.00
Guyana	4.57	3.05	4.11
Haiti	0.00	0.00	0.00
Hong Kong	0.57	0.72	0.65
Honduras	1.62	1.82	1.45
Hungary	2.09	2.42	2.50
Iceland	1.72	1.23	1.61
India	0.84	0.90	1.02
Indonesia	0.70	0.70	0.46
Iran	2.85	2.65	4.39
Iraq	8.79	6.46	7.60
Ireland	1.39	1.28	1.27
Israel	1.02	0.70	0.41
Italy	0.85	1.12	1.25
Ivory Coast	1.96	0.00	0.00
Jamaica	1.15	1.13	1.84
Japan	0.19	0.23	0.16
Jordan	2.45	3.65	5.44
Kazakhstan	1.31	0.42	0.56
Kenya	0.62	1.34	1.03
Kiribati	1.97	1.60	1.50
Kosovo	0.00	7.84	0.00
Kuwait	0.21	0.73	0.87
Kyrgyzstan	5.17	1.01	0.00
Laos	2.15	2.66	2.48
Latvia	5.14	2.65	3.61
Lebanon	3.13	2.84	6.62
Lesotho	0.00	0.00	0.00
Liberia	22.38	13.75	4.55
Libya	2.60	4.35	2.56
Liechtenstein	0.00	0.00	0.00
Lithuania	4.34	3.45	2.99
Luxembourg	0.33	0.38	0.17
Macau	1.03	1.13	0.29
Madagascar	0.00	1.72	0.00
Malawi	1.14	1.04	0.00
Malaysia	1.05	1.58	1.01
Maldives	2.15	0.00	0.64
Mali	0.00	0.00	0.00
Malta	2.09	1.24	1.61
Marshall Islands	3.39	0.00	0.00
Mauritania	0.00	0.00	0.00
Mauritius	1.17	1.56	1.56
Mexico	0.85	0.78	0.77
Micronesia	0.00	7.93	1.95
Moldova	1.15	1.05	1.01
Monaco	2.16	0.00	0.00
Mongolia	2.54	1.44	3.08
Montenegro	3.09	1.03	2.27
Morocco	3.40	0.49	1.91
Mozambique	0.97	1.42	0.51
Myanmar	2.62	1.54	1.60
Namibia	0.71	0.59	0.00
Nauru	0.97	0.68	0.55
Nepal	5.26	1.24	2.32
Netherlands	0.46	0.49	0.37
Netherlands Antilles	N/A	0.00	N/A
New Zealand	0.74	1.09	0.44
Nicaragua	7.41	2.83	11.11
Niger	0.00	0.00	0.00
Nigeria	3.70	4.42	4.40
North Korea	0.00	0.00	0.00
North Macedonia	1.93	1.17	2.97
Norway	0.63	0.50	0.36
Oman	1.15	1.10	0.42
Pakistan	3.94	4.44	4.39
Palau	0.00	9.74	0.00
Palestine	10.84	4.22	13.18
Panama	1.34	0.74	0.00
Papua New Guinea	1.31	0.86	0.82
Paraguay	1.31	1.72	1.61
Peru	1.59	1.80	1.15
Philippines	1.50	1.91	2.00
Poland	1.76	1.60	1.75
Portugal	1.68	2.22	2.29
Qatar	0.52	0.36	0.17
Romania	4.03	4.01	4.77
Russia	0.47	0.61	0.48
Rwanda	2.78	0.00	8.33
Samoa	1.97	2.41	1.99
San Marino	0.00	0.00	2.42
São Tomé and Príncipe	N/A	0.00	N/A
Saudi Arabia	4.93	5.18	5.39
Senegal	2.94	0.00	2.56
Serbia	1.13	1.06	1.34
Serbia and Montenegro	0.00	0.00	0.00
Seychelles	1.38	1.55	1.34
Sierra Leone	0.00	5.34	4.63
Singapore	0.32	0.33	0.26
Slovakia	0.67	1.01	0.87
Slovenia	0.60	0.66	0.82
Solomon Islands	1.59	1.63	1.19
Somalia	0.00	0.00	0.00
South Africa	0.91	0.72	0.65
South Korea	0.89	1.02	1.02
Spain	0.95	0.94	1.05
Sri Lanka	1.23	1.26	1.25
Stateless	5.11	4.31	5.79
Saint Kitts and Nevis	0.00	0.00	0.00
Saint Lucia	0.00	0.00	0.00
Saint Vincent and the Grenadines	0.00	0.00	0.00
Sudan	4.06	2.34	4.96
Suriname	0.00	12.00	0.00
Swaziland	0.00	0.00	0.00
Sweden	0.61	0.61	0.60
Switzerland	0.47	0.39	0.24
Syria	2.70	13.23	20.68
Tajikistan	0.00	0.00	0.00
Taiwan	0.58	0.72	0.73
Tanzania	0.69	0.19	0.79
Thailand	0.85	1.02	0.92
Togo	0.00	0.00	8.33
Tonga	3.54	5.60	2.88
Trinidad and Tobago	0.95	0.31	1.04
Tunisia	1.44	0.88	0.83
Turkey	1.80	1.15	1.55
Turkmenistan	6.25	0.00	0.00
Tuvalu	1.26	0.64	0.40
Uganda	4.16	2.95	1.92
Ukraine	1.40	2.08	1.32
United Arab Emirates	0.31	0.38	0.34
United Kingdom	0.68	0.69	0.58
United Nations Agency	2.78	1.08	0.00
United Nations Convention Refugees	9.19	4.40	2.63
United Nations Organisation	0.00	0.97	0.00
United States	0.74	0.73	0.51
Uruguay	2.97	0.77	0.37
Uzbekistan	3.83	0.00	0.76
Vanuatu	0.91	1.17	0.85
Vatican City	0.00	0.00	0.00
Venezuela	1.61	1.24	0.68
Vietnam	1.99	1.18	1.44
Yemen	3.85	4.37	2.86
Yugoslavia	3.77	0.00	0.00
Zambia	1.61	1.77	0.42
Zimbabwe	3.12	2.02	2.79
Global average	0.74	0.79	0.69

== Enforcement of visa restrictions ==
On 1 June 2013, the Migration Amendment (Reform of Employer Sanctions) Act 2013 commenced and put the onus on businesses to ensure that their employees maintain the necessary work entitlements in Australia. The new legislation enables the Department of Immigration and Border Protection to levy infringement notices against business (A$15,300) and individual (A$3,060) employers on a strict liability basis – meaning that there is no requirement to prove fault, negligence or intention.

== Reciprocity issues ==
Whilst nationals of all member states of the European Union and Schengen associated countries were entitled to use the eVisitor system since 27 October 2008, the European Commission assessed whether the eVisitor visa fully satisfied reciprocity requirements. In its Seventh report on certain third countries' maintenance of visa requirements in breach of the principle of reciprocity from 2012, the European Commission found that in principle, the eVisitor provided equal treatment of the nationals of all member states and Schengen associated countries. However, while the average autogrant rate was high (86.36%), the quarterly reports on eVisitor application statistics showed that applications by nationals of some member states were mainly processed manually. Autogrant rates for Bulgaria and Romania were at just 18% and 23%, as the majority of applications were sent for additional examination. The Commission therefore engaged to continue to closely monitor the processing of eVisitor applications. The Commission would submit its assessment of whether eVisitor was equivalent to the Schengen visa application process in a separate document in parallel with the assessment of the Final Rule on ESTA. The Schengen Area does not have visa requirements in place for short-term stays of Australian nationals. The United Kingdom and Ireland are exempt from this particular EU policy, but still do not impose any short-term visa requirements on Australians.

In 2014, Bulgaria, Cyprus and Romania notified the European Commission that they considered Australia's low rate of automatically granted eVisitor authorisations for their nationals tantamount to a normal visa requirement for their nationals. Implications were that if the notification were accepted the EU might suspend the visa exemption for certain categories of Australian nationals, and at the latest six months after publication of the regulation, the Commission might decide to suspend the visa-free access to all Australian nationals.

Some countries regard the ETA as being equivalent to visa-free travel when deciding whether to grant the same to Australians wishing to enter their territory. The United States, for example, offers its Visa Waiver Program to Australian passport holders, and one of the conditions for joining this scheme is that "Governments provide reciprocal visa-free travel for U.S. citizens for 90 days for tourism or business purposes". However, the United States has required from January 2009 a similar ETA, called the Electronic System for Travel Authorization, from nationals of Australia. As of December 1998, Japan also granted visa-free access to Australians. Other ETA eligible countries and territories Canada, Hong Kong, Malaysia, Singapore, South Korea and Taiwan also grant visa-free access to Australians while Brunei grants Australians a 30-day visa on arrival.

== Future ==
In 2014, Australia announced that among the countries discussed for visa waiver extension were the Gulf Cooperation Council countries.

== Historic stamp gallery ==
Visa and Passport stamps

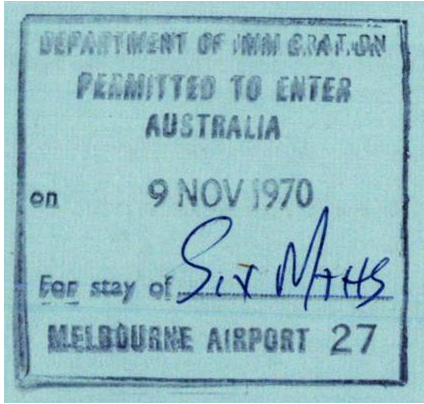
Arrival stamp Melbourne Airport - 1970

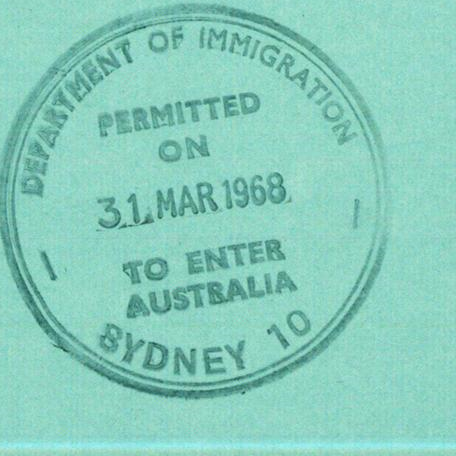
Arrival stamp Sydney via ship - 1968

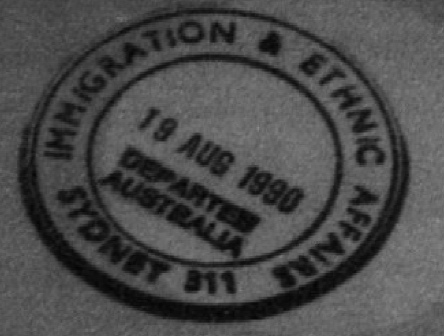
Departure stamp Sydney Airport - 1990

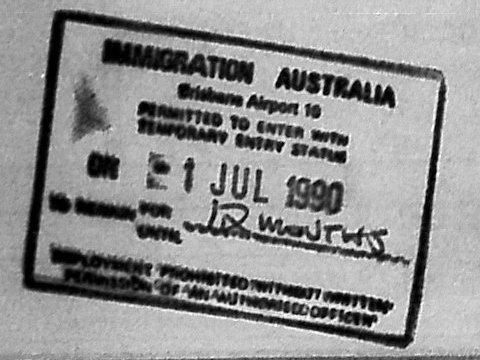
Arrival stamp Brisbane Airport - 1990

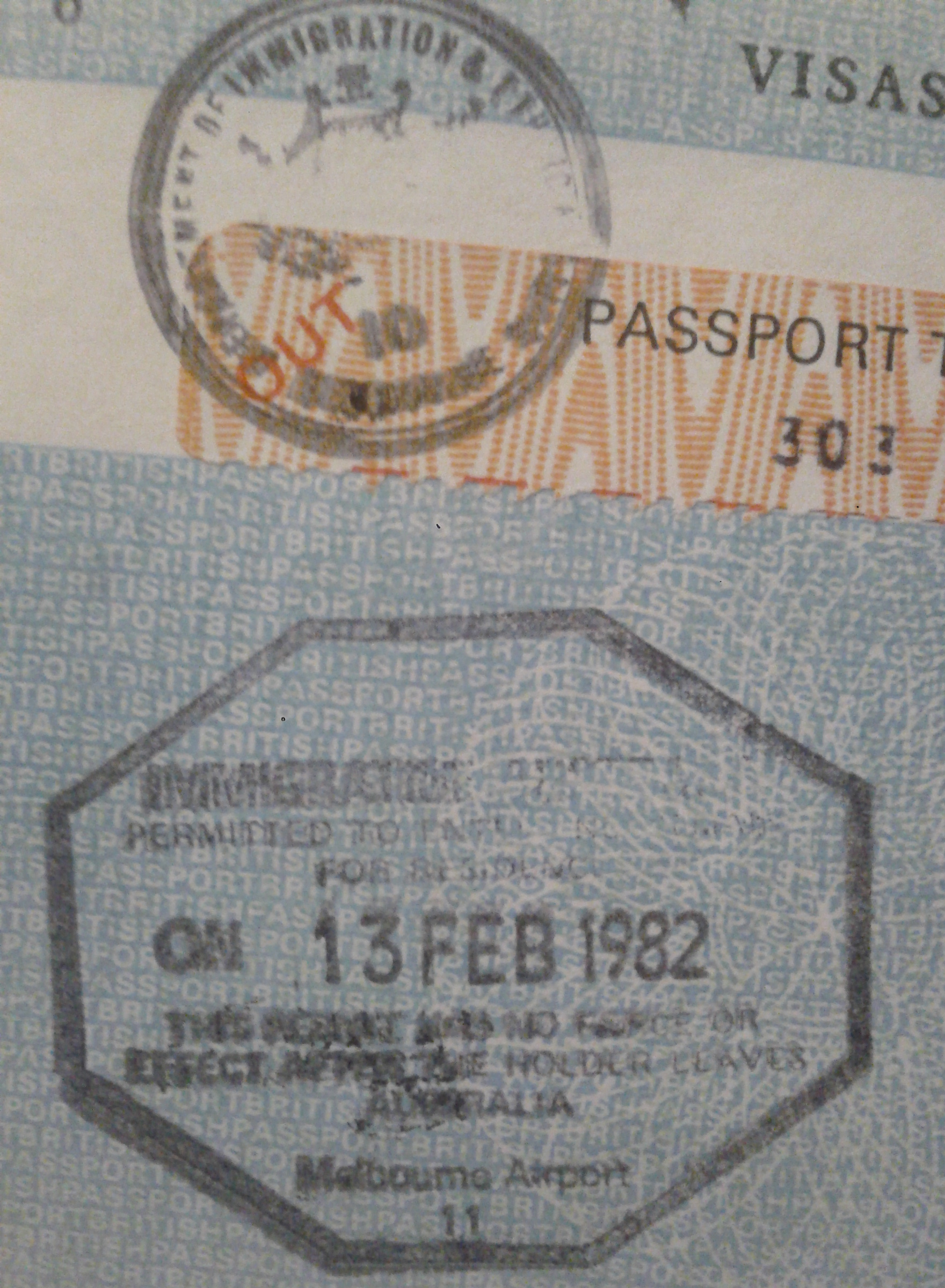
Arrival stamps Melbourne Airport - 1982

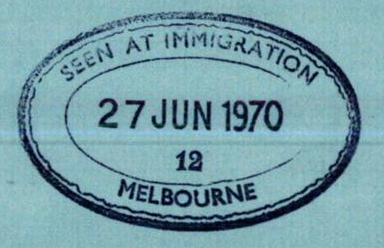
Arrival stamp Melbourne Airport - 1970

== Visitor statistics ==
According to the data with the Australian Bureau of Statistics [ABS], in 2018–19, there were approximately 9.3 million international visitors that came to Australia on short trips.1

By a short trip is implied a trip that is of a lesser duration than 1 year. As per the ABS, the number reflects the total number of border crossings in the duration rather than the number of people travelling to Australia from overseas.

Among the international visitors in Australia in 2018–19, the maximum number were Chinese nationals. With more than 1.4 million visitors across Australia, China was the biggest source country for international tourists in the Land Down Under in 2018–19.

The primary reason for international travellers to come to Australia was for holiday. Around 47% stated their reason as holiday.

When in Australia, the international travellers spent an average of 11 days in the country. While travellers spend more time in South Australia [17 days], those who visited Queensland stayed for around 10 days on an average.

The record high number of 9.3 million visitors in 2018-19 was around 3.8 million over than the number of international visitors 10 years ago, and 272,300 more as compared to a year previously.2

Generally, there has been an increase recorded in the number of international visitors to Australia in the recent decades.

Surveys have revealed that a significant number of Indians that traveled to Australia for recreation preferred heading to South Australia.

Most visitors arriving to Australia were from the following countries of nationality:

Country/Territory	2018	2017	2016	2015	2014	2013
China	1,432,100	1,356,800	1,208,300	1,023,600	839,500	708,900
New Zealand	1,384,900	1,359,500	1,347,400	1,309,900	1,241,400	1,192,800
United States	789,100	780,400	716,600	609,900	553,000	501,100
United Kingdom	733,400	733,000	715,700	688,400	652,100	657,600
Japan	469,200	434,700	417,900	335,500	326,500	324,400
Singapore	447,800	432,900	429,700	395,800	372,100	339,800
Malaysia	401,100	396,800	390,000	338,800	324,500	278,100
India	357,700	302,700	262,300	233,100	196,600	168,600
Hong Kong	308,700	281,200	247,900	219,700	201,600	183,500
South Korea	288,000	302,200	280,100	230,100	204,100	197,500
Total	9,245,800	8,815,300	8,269,200	7,428.600	6,868.000	6,382.300

== Somalia ==
Entry and transit is refused to Somalia nationals using Somali travel documents. Nationals of Somalia must use other documents to enter.

== Hamas-Israel Conflict: Visa Support and financial assistance ==
The Australian Government is providing an additional $1 million in funding for emergency financial assistance in 2024-25 to people from significantly affected areas of Israel and the Occupied Palestinian Territories who have arrived in Australia on temporary visas and who have been assessed to be in financial hardship. This increases total funding provided for emergency financial assistance in 2023-24 and 2024-25 to $3 million. The Australian Government has stated that People from significantly affected areas of Israel and the Occupied Palestinian Territories who have arrived on a temporary visa and are unable to access standard visa pathways or return, may apply for a Bridging visa E (subclass 050) (BVE). People from significantly affected areas of Israel and the Occupied Palestinian Territories and their family members who meet the requirements for a departure BVE may remain in Australia lawfully as the holder of a BVE until they are able to make arrangements to depart Australia.

== See also ==
- Visa requirements for Australian citizens
- Tourism in Australia
- Australian migration zone
- Immigration to Australia
- Passenger Movement Charge
- 457 visa (1996-2018)
