= Special purpose visa =

Australia operates a universal visa regime which requires that every non-Australian citizen entering or who is present within the Australian migration zone holds a valid visa. In Australian migration law, to exempt certain persons from the visa and immigration clearance arrangements, a so-called special purpose visa applies by operation of law to certain non-citizens.

The special purpose visa arises under section 33 of the Migration Act 1958 to effectively exempt certain persons from the normal processes for entry into Australia, including:

- members of the Royal Family (however, the King of Australia is outside the scope of any Australian immigration requirements)
- members of the royal party accompanying the Royal Family
- official guests of the Australian government, including dependents and staff members
- members of the crew of a non-military ship visiting an Australian port or being imported into Australia, provided they hold valid passports and seafarers' documentation
- crews of foreign naval ships visiting Australia
- members of the armed forces of certain countries with status of forces agreements with Australia (including certain civilians attached to these armed forces) with valid military documents and travel orders, together with spouses and children holding valid national passports and military identification
- airline crew, with valid passports and employer documentation
- persons visiting Macquarie Island with advance permission of the Tasmanian Environment Department
- transit passengers from specified (gazetted) countries in airside transit in Australia for less than eight hours
- traditional Indonesian fishermen visiting the Territory of Ashmore and Cartier Islands.

No visa application is required to claim a special purpose visa, and no fee is charged. It is possible to hold a special purpose visa simultaneously with another type of Australian visa.

People holding a special purpose visa must abide by the legal conditions attaching to their status, otherwise they becomes an unlawful non-citizen liable to immigration detention and removal from Australia in the normal manner.

== See also ==
- Visa policy of Australia
- Electronic Travel Authority
- Australian permanent resident
- Australian nationality law
- Special Category Visa
- Visa requirements for crew members
