= Permanent Resident of Norfolk Island visa =

Defunct visa

A Permanent Resident of Norfolk Island visa was a type of Australian immigration visa granted on arrival in Australia to a non-citizen who is a permanent resident of Norfolk Island.

Before 1 July 2016, Norfolk Island was the only inhabited Australian territory that was outside the Australian migration zone and had its own immigration laws (which did apply to Australian citizens).

Since Australian nationality law extended to the territory, Norfolk Islanders were and remain Australian citizens, and therefore had and retain the same right to enter and live in Australia as any other Australian citizens. For Norfolk Island permanent residents who were not Australian citizens, the Government of Australia created a Permanent Resident of Norfolk Island visa (subclass 834) to grant them automatic residence status when they travelled to the Australian migration zone before 1 July 2016.

No advance application was required and no visa charge was levied. Applicants had to present to an Australian immigration officer a passport endorsed with a right to reside permanently on Norfolk Island.

Australian permanent resident status remained valid for as long as the visa holder remained in the Australian migration zone. The visa ceased on departure from the migration zone but a new visa could be granted when the person returned, if Norfolk Island permanent residence was still held.

Although a permanent visa, this visa could also be used to take short holidays or business trips in Australia as an alternative to the Electronic Travel Authority. It could also be used for permanent settlement in Australia.

This visa was very similar to the Special Category Visa except that it was permanent (without a re-entry facility) while the SCV is technically a temporary visa.

== Norfolk Island reform ==
On 1 July 2016, the Norfolk Island Immigration Act 1980 was repealed and the Australian migration zone has extended to include Norfolk Island. Arrangements have been made to transfer Norfolk Permanent Resident Permits to Australian permits. New Zealand citizens residing in Norfolk Island are automatically granted the Special Category Visa (subclass 444) regardless of their previous status, while residents of other nationalities are eligible for the Provisional Resident Return visa (subclass 159) and/or the Confirmatory (Residence) visa (subclass 808). As travelling between Norfolk Island and Australia is now domestic, immigration clearance is not required and the Permanent Resident of Norfolk Island visa is no longer granted.

== See also ==
- Visa policy of Australia
- Australian permanent resident
- Norfolk Island
- Australian nationality law
- Special category visa
- Electronic Travel Authority
- Special purpose visa
