= New Zealand and Australia =

New Zealand and Australia may be a perspective on Australia–New Zealand relations

- from New Zealand Australians
- from Australian New Zealanders
