= Excision =

Excision may refer to:

- In surgery, the partial removal of an organ, tissue, bone or tumor from a body
- Type II female genital mutilation
- A term used by the Australian government as part of its definition of the Australian migration zone
- Excision theorem in algebraic topology, a branch of mathematics
- Excise, taxes charged on the purchase of goods or services
- Excision (musician), a Canadian dubstep producer from British Columbia.
- Excision (film), a 2012 American horror film
