= New Zealand Australians =

Total population
- 530,491 (by birth, 2021); 203,507 (by ancestry, 2021)

Regions with significant populations
- New Zealand-born people by state or territory
- Queensland: 192,037
- New South Wales: 114,231
- Victoria: 80,235
- Western Australia: 70,735
- South Australia: 12,930

Languages
- Australian English · New Zealand English · Māori

Related ethnic groups
- Australian · European Australians · Anglo-Celtic Australians · New Zealander

New Zealand Australians are Australian citizens whose origins are in New Zealand, as well as New Zealand migrants and expatriates based in Australia.

Migration from New Zealand to Australia is common, given Australia's proximity to New Zealand, its larger economy, free movement agreement and cultural links between the two countries.

== History ==
=== 20th century ===
Under various arrangements since the 1920s, there has been a free flow of people between Australia and New Zealand. Since 1973 the Trans-Tasman Travel Arrangement has allowed for the free movement of citizens of one nation to the other. One major exception to these travel privileges has been for individuals with outstanding warrants or criminal backgrounds.

New Zealanders in Australia were previously granted permanent residency upon arrival in Australia with, like all permanent residents, access to the Australian social security system. In 1986 the Hawke Labor Government brought in the rule whereby New Zealanders had to wait six months after arrival to qualify for social security benefits.

=== Special Category Visa ===
In 1994, the Keating Labor Government introduced special category visas for New Zealand citizens, which included the denial of HECS fee help and Austudy payments for tertiary study unless SCV holders became Australian citizens. Despite the increased immigration restrictions, net migration from New Zealand to Australia has still continued.

In 1998, the Howard Government increased the stand down period for general welfare payments to two years, which is the standard waiting period for all permanent residents in Australia. During these changes, New Zealand citizens remained as Permanent Residents upon arrival in Australia, with the same basic rights and pathway to citizenship as all Permanent Residents.

=== 2001 immigration legislative changes ===
People with New Zealand ancestry as a percentage of the population in Australia divided geographically by statistical local area, as of the 2011 census

Regulations were dramatically changed in 2001 by The Family and Community Services Legislation Amendment (New Zealand Citizens) Bill 2001 which categorizes New Zealanders who arrived in Australia after 26 February 2001 as non-protected special visa holders. That makes them ineligible for many social security benefits. Those New Zealanders can stay in Australia indefinitely but without any civic rights (they cannot vote in any Government elections) or route to citizenship. More than 175,000 people – or 47 per cent of the New Zealanders living in Australia – are thought to be affected by the law, which has been labelled "discriminatory" by campaigners.

In 2011, a series of anti-discrimination lawsuits overturned decisions to deny New Zealand citizens social security benefits under 2001 Howard government laws that restricted access to permanent residency. Australian citizens who go and live in New Zealand continue to enjoy the social security benefits and are treated as permanent residents in New Zealand.

In June 2011 Australian Prime Minister Julia Gillard and New Zealand Prime Minister John Key discussed the issue and Australia was reported to be looking at easing residency requirements for up to 100,000 New Zealanders stuck in limbo after the rule change in 2001. There are complaints in New Zealand that there is a brain drain to Australia.

=== Section 501 character test and subsequent developments ===
In 2014, the Australian Government amended the Migration Act to allow the cancellation of Australian visas for non-citizens on character grounds, including having been sentenced to prison for more than twelve months. The stricter character requirements also target non-citizens who have lived in Australia for most of their lives. By July 2018, about 1,300 New Zealanders had been deported from Australia on character grounds. At least 60% of New Zealanders living in Australia who were deported on character grounds were of Māori and Pasifika descent. While Australian officials have defended the tougher deportation measures, their New Zealand counterparts have warned that these would damage the historical "bonds of mateship" between the two countries.

In February 2016, the Australian and New Zealand Prime Ministers Malcolm Turnbull and John Key reached a deal to grant a pathway to Australian citizenship for New Zealanders living in Australia who were earning five times over the average wage. In July 2017, the Australian Government introduced the "Skilled Independent visa (subclass 189)" to fast-track the Australian citizenship naturalisation process for New Zealanders living in Australia. Under this visa, New Zealanders who have lived in Australia for at least five years and earning an annual income over A$53,900 can apply for Australian citizenship. Between 60,000 and 80,000 New Zealanders are eligible for the Skilled Independent Visa. According to the Australian Broadcasting Corporation (ABC), 1,512 skilled independent visas had been issued by late February 2018 with another 7,500 visas still being processed. This visa scheme was criticized by the "Ozkiwi lobby" since two thirds of New Zealanders living in Australia did not meet the qualifying wage.

In mid-July 2018, the ABC aired a controversial documentary entitled "Don't call Australia Home" showcasing the accelerated deportation of New Zealand nationals under Australia's immigration "character test." ABC guest host Peter FitzSimons interviewed three of the deported New Zealanders, who had subsequently resettled in New Zealand. The documentary featured the Justice Minister of New Zealand, Andrew Little, who criticized the high deportation rate on human rights grounds. The ABC documentary and Little's remarks provoked criticism from several Australian officials, including Home Affairs Minister Peter Dutton and Assistant Home Affairs Minister Alex Hawke, who defended Australia's immigration policies on law and order grounds.

Many New Zealanders living, studying and working in Australia under the Special Category Visa were adversely affected by the COVID-19 pandemic; with many being unable to access Centrelink payments. On 30 March 2020, Australian Prime Minister Scott Morrison announced that Special Category Visa holders would be eligible for AU$1,500 fortnightly payments as hardship assistance following negotiations with New Zealand Prime Minister Jacinda Ardern.

On 6 July 2022, Australian Prime Minister Anthony Albanese confirmed that entitled New Zealand Special Category Visa holders would be eligible for flood relief assistance in response to the 2022 New South Wales floods. This flood relief assistance consists of a one-off means-tested payment of A$10,000 for adults and A$4,000 for small kids. NZ Prime Minister Ardern welcomed the development as a positive welfare step in Australian-New Zealand bilateral relations.

=== Citizenship pathway ===
On 8 July 2022, Albanese confirmed plans to expand voting rights and citizenship pathways for New Zealand citizens residing in Australia. In addition, he also indicated that the Albanese government would "tweak" the Section 501 deportation policy to consider individuals' long-term connection to Australia.

On 22 April 2023, Australian Prime Minister Anthony Albanese, Home Affairs Minister Clare O'Neil, and Immigration Minister Andrew Giles announced the creation of a new direct pathway to Australian citizenship for Special Category Visa holders. From 1 July 2023, SCV holders who have resided in Australia for four years and meet other residency requirements will be eligible to apply directly for Australian citizenship without having to apply for permanent residency first. In addition, children born in Australia to a New Zealander from 1 July 2023 will automatically be eligible for New Zealand citizenship. The announcement was welcomed by New Zealand Prime Minister Chris Hipkins and Oz Kiwi chairperson Joanne Cox for improving New Zealanders' access to Australian citizenship and social security while potentially reducing the deportation of New Zealanders.

By 15 August 2023, over 15,000 New Zealanders residing in Australia had applied for Australian citizenship under the new criteria, with 500 passing the Australian citizenship test at the time of publication. According to The Guardian, New Zealand citizens made up for half of Australian citizenship applications since 1 July 2023. 35% of applicants came from Queensland, 30% from Victoria, and 20% from New South Wales.

== Demographics ==
By 2001 there were eight times more New Zealanders living in Australia than Australians living in New Zealand. Many such New Zealanders include Māori Australians and Pasifika New Zealanders. People born in New Zealand continue to be the second largest source of immigration to Australia, representing 11% of total permanent additions in 2005–06 and accounting for 2.3% of Australia's population at June 2006. Australians make up a similar proportion of New Zealand's population.

According to the 2011 Census, there were 187,212 people of New Zealand descent in Australia and 483,398 New Zealand-born people residing in the country at the moment of the census, an increase of 24.1 per cent compared to the 2006 Census. The largest New Zealand-born community in Australia was in the state of Queensland, with 192,037 people.

As of June 2025, it is estimated that there are about 620,000 New Zealand citizens living in Australia, which was about 15 per cent of the population of New Zealand.

New Zealand Australian demography by religion (note that it includes only Zealander born in New zealand and not australian with a Zealander background)
Religious group	2021 (Note: Religious breakdown proportions based on "Zealander" ethnic or cultural origin response on the 2021 census.)		2016 (Note: Religious breakdown proportions based on "Zealander" ethnic or cultural origin response on the 2016 census.)		2011 (Note: Religious breakdown proportions based on "Zealander" ethnic or cultural origin response on the 2011 census.)	
Religious group	Pop.	%	Pop.	%	Pop.	%
Anglican	49,877 ▼	9.4% ▼	61,636 ▼	11.89% ▼	75,828	15.69%
Catholic	61,395 ▼	11.57% ▼	68,837▼	13.28% ▼	73,147	15.13%
Presbyterian	22,704 ▼	4.28% ▼	29,521 ▼	5.69% ▼	35,099	7.26%
Eastern Orthodox	1,358 ▲	0.26% ▲	1,289 ▼	0.25% ▼	1,388	0.29%
Other Christian denomination	78,083 ▼	14.72% ▼	82,054 ▲	15.83% ▼	79,996	16.55%
(Total Christian)	213,418 ▼	40.23% ▼	243,789 ▼	47.02%▼	265,428	54.91%
Irreligion	279,600 ▲	52.71% ▲	228,559 ▲	44.08% ▲	167,280	34.61%
Buddhism	3,951 ▼	0.74% ▼	4,747 ▼	0.92% ▼	5,214	1.08%
Hinduism	4,128 ▲	0.78% ▲	3,217 ▲	0.62% ▲	2,228	0.46%
Islam	4,922 ▲	0.93% ▲	3,930 ▲	0.76% ▲	2,687	0.56%
Judaism	947 ▲	0.18% ▲	906 ▼	0.17% ▼	959	0.2%
Other	3,662 ▲	0.69% ▲	3,428 ▲	0.66% ▼	3,219	0.67%
Not Stated	19,872 ▼	3.75% ▼	29,888 ▼	5.76% ▼	36,383	7.53%
Total Zealander Australian population	530,492 ▲	100%	518,462 ▲	100%	483,398	100%

New Zealand Australian demography by religion (Ancestry included, it also includes Maori New Zealand people)
Religious group	2021		2016		2011	
Religious group	Pop.	%	Pop.	%	Pop.	%
Anglican	78,258 ▼	8.72% ▼	101,336 ▼	11.67% ▼	123,182	15.42%
Catholic	107,004 ▼	11.92% ▼	120,045 ▼	13.82% ▼	125,064	15.65%
Presbyterian	29,395 ▼	3.27% ▼	39,118 ▼	4.5% ▼	46,669	5.84%
Eastern Orthodox	2,794 ▲	0.31% ▲	2,384 ▼	0.27% ▼	2,387	0.3%
Other Christian denomination	127,176 ▼	14.16% ▼	136,058 ▲	15.67% ▼	133,371	16.69%
(Total Christian)	344,635 ▼	38.38% ▼	399,695 ▼	46.03%▼	430,681	53.9%
Irreligion	499,723 ▲	55.65% ▲	397,915 ▲	45.82% ▲	288,473	36.1%
Buddhism	5,395 ▼	0.6% ▼	6,656 ▼	0.77% ▼	7,103	0.89%
Hinduism	4,627 ▲	0.52% ▲	3,682 ▲	0.42% ▲	2,500	0.31%
Islam	6,412 ▲	0.71% ▲	5,087 ▲	0.59% ▲	3,481	0.44%
Judaism	1,514 ▲	0.17%	1,511 ▼	0.17% ▼	1,577	0.2%
Other	5,576 ▲	0.62% ▲	5,282 ▲	0.61%	3,219	0.61%
Not Stated	30,096 ▼	3.35% ▼	48,518 ▼	5.59% ▼	60,338	7.55%
Total Zealander Australian population	897,962 ▲	100%	868,341 ▲	100%	799,051	100%

== Geographic distribution ==
More New Zealand-born people in Australia were concentrated in Queensland than any other state, with more than half of those in Queensland living in the city of Brisbane. New South Wales was home to the second largest New Zealand-born population with 114,231 people of which 81,064 were located in its largest city, Sydney. The third largest population was found in the state of Victoria with 80,235 people. The state of Western Australia had the fourth largest population with 70,735 people of which 33,751 were located in the city of Perth, and South Australia had the fifth largest at 12,930.

== Socio-economics ==
New Zealand citizens have a high labour-force participation rate (78.2 per cent at July 2012) compared with those born in Australia (78.0 per cent). New Zealanders living in Australia also have a higher median weekly income ($760) than Australians born in Australia ($597) and immigrants in general ($538), which may be partially due to working longer hours (51.8 hours per week) than the Australian-born (45.6 hours) or immigrants in general (44.7 hours).

== Cultural background ==
The majority of New Zealanders, both in Australia and New Zealand, are New Zealanders of European descent, mainly of British ancestry. In the 2011 Census most New Zealand-born people living in Australia reported being of English descent (222,956), followed by those of New Zealander (86,724), Scottish (83,156) and Māori (82,577) descent.

== Language ==
The main languages spoken by New Zealand-born people in Australia were English (440,649), Samoan (11,931) and Māori (8,067).

== See also ==
- Australia – New Zealand relations
- Australian New Zealanders
- Europeans in Oceania
- Expatriate Party of New Zealand
- Immigration to Australia
- Māori Australians
