= Resident Return Visa =

Resident return visas (RRV) are three separate but related systems for allowing ordinarily resident and former resident foreign nationals in Australia, New Zealand, and the United States to travel to another country and return to the issuing country.

== Australia ==
In Australia, a Resident Return Visa (RRV) (subclasses 155 and 157) is a re-entry visa allowing the holder of that visa to travel to another country and return to the Australian migration zone. RRVs allow Australian permanent residents to re-enter Australia as often as they wish during the validity of the visa. The duration of the validity of an RRV ranges from 3 months to 5 years, depending on the subclass and the applicant's circumstances.

== New Zealand ==
The similar visa in New Zealand was called Returning Resident's Visa (RRV). It gave New Zealand permanent residents the right to resume their residence status when they returned to New Zealand. The first Returning Resident's Visa was valid for 2 years. An Indefinite Returning Resident's Visa (IRRV) was issued once the resident had shown commitment to New Zealand over the previous two years. 12 month or 14-day RRVs were also issued under different circumstances.

Under the Immigration Act 2009, the Returning Resident's Visas were replaced by the resident visas and/or permanent resident visas. A resident visa holder may also be subject to other ‘conditions’ depending on the residence category they applied under. A permanent resident visa allows the holder to re-enter New Zealand as a permanent resident anytime. A permanent resident visa is not subject to any conditions.

== United States ==
In accordance with United States immigration law, lawful permanent residents who have been outside of the United States for more than one year without a reentry permit, or those who have remained outside the United States beyond the validity of their reentry permit, are required to process a new immigrant visa before they will be permitted to return to the United States as a lawful permanent resident.

Lawful permanent resident who have remained outside the United States for extended periods of time may apply at their nearest United States embassy or consulate to process the SB-1 Returning Resident Visa.

Applicants will be required to pay new visa processing fees and medical fees, but the person is not required to file a new immigrant petition.

=== Qualifying for Returning Resident Status ===
An applicant for a returning resident visa must prove that he or she:

- had the status of a lawful permanent resident at the time of departure from the United States,
- departed from the U.S. with the intention of returning and have not abandoned this intention, and
- is returning to the United States from a temporary visit abroad and, if the stay abroad was protracted, it was caused by reasons beyond the applicant's control and for which the applicant was not responsible.

Required documentation includes:

- A completed Application to Determine Returning Resident Status (Form DS-117);
- The applicant's Permanent Resident Card (Form I-551);
- The applicant's reentry permit;
- Evidence of dates of travel outside of the United States, such as airline tickets or passport stamps;
- Evidence of the applicant's ties to the United States and the applicant's intention to returns, such as tax returns and evidence of economic, family, and social ties to the United States;
- Evidence that the applicant's protracted stay outside of the United States was for reasons beyond the applicant's control, such as being medically incapacitated;
- Payment of the required fees.

=== Spouse or Child of a Member of the U.S. Armed Forces or Civilian Employee of the U.S. Government Stationed Abroad ===
The spouse or child of a member of the United States Armed Forces or of a civilian employee of the United States government stationed abroad on official orders may use a United States Permanent Resident Card to enter the United States, even if the Permanent Resident Card has expired.

A Returning Resident (SB-1) immigrant visa would not be required as long as the person has not abandoned Lawful Permanent Resident status and the spouse or parent is also returning to the United States.
