= Expatriate Party of New Zealand =

Former NZ political party

The Expatriate Party of New Zealand was an unregistered political party that sought to represent people who consider themselves New Zealanders but who do not reside in New Zealand. It contested one electorate, but not the party vote, at the 2014 general election.

== Policies ==
According to the party's Facebook page, the Expatriate Party sought "to provide representation for, and to promote fairness in the treatment of all members of the mobile global workforce who identify as New Zealanders, irrespective of where they live or their residency or citizenship status."

The party put forward several policies during its 2014 campaign. Its main policy for that election was to create fairer rules to allow New Zealanders to become Australian permanent residents, with the rights to services such as healthcare that this would bring. However, the party made clear it did not intend to seek access to unemployment benefits. It also supported reforms to New Zealand law regarding whether and how expatriates may participate in New Zealand elections (including studying the introduction of electronic voting); reduction of regulation and taxation (which it considers a disincentive for expatriates to remain connected to New Zealand); and stronger social and economic ties with New Zealand's traditional allies.

== 2014 election ==
The party spokespeople were Grant Cheesman and Nick Teulon, both of whom were New Zealand-born residents of Australia. By August 2014, the party had announced that it had sufficient numbers to register as a political party in New Zealand, which would have allowed it to contest the 2014 election. However, the registration process was not completed before Writ Day due to issues in verifying registered members, leaving the party unable to contest the party vote. The Expatriate Party ran one electorate candidate at the 2014 elections; Vicky Rose contested the Māori electorate of Ikaroa-Rāwhiti,. She received 70 votes, or 0.32% of the electorate vote, and came last out of the six candidates.

== 2014–2017 ==
During 2014, the party stated it did not rule out the possibility of participating in Australian elections in the future. However, it did not contest the 2016 Australian election.

== Subsequent actions ==
On 8 February 2017, the party announced on its Facebook page that it had talked with the Electoral Commission about enrolling for the 2017 election, and another post on 3 March stated it had applied for broadcasting funding. However, in August 2017 the party announced they had not achieved the numbers needed to register the party and that it would not contest the election.
