= Permanent residency =

Status of a person in a country

Permanent residency is a person's legal resident status in a country or territory of which such person is not a citizen but where they have the right to reside on a permanent basis. This is usually for a permanent period; a person with such legal status is known as a permanent resident.

Permanent residency itself is distinct from right of abode, which waives immigration control for such persons. Persons having permanent residency still require immigration control if they do not have right of abode. However, a right of abode automatically grants people permanent residency. This status also gives work permit in most cases. In many Western countries, the status of permanent resident confers a right of abode upon the holder despite not being a citizen of the particular country.

== Nations with permanent residency systems ==
Not every nation allows permanent residency. Rights and application may vary widely.

All European Union countries have a facility for someone to become a permanent resident, as EU legislation allows an EU national who moves to another EU country to attain permanent resident status after residing there for five years. The European Union also sets out permanent residency rights for long-term resident third country nationals under directive (2003/109/EC). A novel approach was the granting of rights across the national borders of states adhering to the directive. Permanent residents of European Union states who are citizens of another EU state enjoy extra rights; they can vote in European Parliament (and, in some cases, municipal and regional) elections in their country of residence. As an example, a Romanian citizen who emigrated to France would be able to vote in local and European Parliament elections in France (but not Romania).

As for Hong Kong and Macau, both special administrative regions of China, they do not have their own citizenship laws, the term "permanent residents" refer to persons with the right of abode in these territories. Most permanent residents of Chinese descent are Chinese citizens according to Chinese nationality law.

Other countries have varying forms of such residency and relationships with other countries with regards to permanent residency. Such as Canada which conducts CRS draws through its Express Entry system to invite its temporary resident for permanent residency.

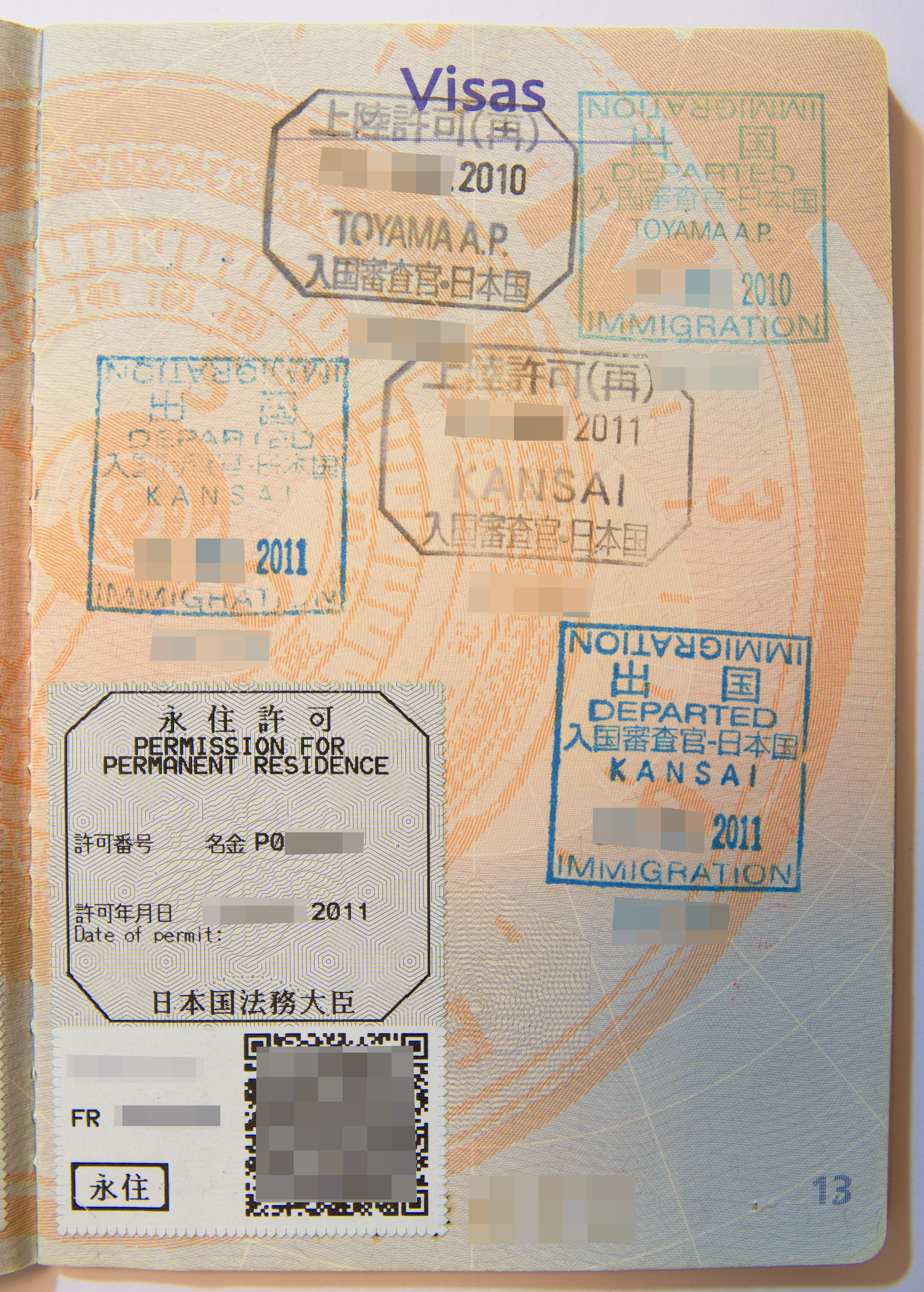
Japanese permission for permanent residence issued in 2011 on a French passport

These countries and territories have some type of permanent resident status:

- Argentina: called residente permanente
- Armenia
- Australia
- Bahrain
- UAE
- Belize
- Brazil: called Carteira de Registro Nacional Migratório (CRNM)
- Brunei: called penduduk tetap
- Canada: permanent residents, previously known as landed immigrants
- Chile
- China: called 永久居留权 yǒngjiǔ-jūliúquán, programme started from 2004
- Costa Rica
- Curaçao: called sedula
- Dominican Republic
- Ecuador
- European Union:
  - Austria: called Niederlassungsbewilligung
  - Belgium: B or C permit for non-EEA citizens
  - Bulgaria: called karta za postojanno prebivavašt v Republika Bălgarija čuždenec
  - Croatia: called stalni boravak
  - Cyprus
  - Czech Republic: called trvalý pobyt
  - Denmark: called permanent opholdstilladelse
  - Estonia
  - Finland: permit P
  - France: some types of titre de séjour, such as the carte de résident
  - Germany: called Niederlassungserlaubnis
  - Greece: called Πράσινη Κάρτα
  - Hungary
  - Ireland: called Permanent residency card
  - Italy
  - Latvia: called pastāvīgās uzturēšanās atļaujas
  - Lithuania: called Leidimas nuolat gyventi
  - Luxembourg: called résident longue durée/long-term resident
  - Malta
  - Netherlands: called Verblijfsvergunning voor onbepaalde tijd; class II, IV, or V permit
  - Poland: called pobyt stały
  - Portugal: called residência permanente
  - Romania: called Permis de şedere permanentă
  - Slovakia: called trvalý pobyt
  - Slovenia: called Dovoljenje za stalno prebivanje
  - Spain
  - Sweden: called Permanent uppehållstillstånd
- Ghana
- Guatemala
- Hong Kong: permanent residence through the Right of Abode, regardless of citizenship
- Iceland: called ótímabundið dvalarleyfi
- India: called Permanent Resident Status Scheme
- Indonesia: called Kartu Izin Tinggal Tetap
- Iran
- Israel: תושב קבע toshav-keva, which means a permanent resident without Israeli citizenship
- Japan: called 永住許可 eijūkyoka
- Macau: called Residente Permanente, regardless of citizenship
- Malaysia: called pemastautin tetap
- Mexico: called residente permanente
- New Zealand
- Nicaragua: called Résidents Permanents Nicaragua
- North Macedonia
- Norway: called permanent oppholdstillatelse
- Panama
- Peru: a permanent residency option is available for those from countries which prohibit dual citizenship. Permanent residency only requires an annual fee, and no other supporting documents
- Philippines
- Qatar
- Sri Lanka: called Permanent Residence Visa
- Taiwan
- Russia: called вид на жительство vid na žítel'stvo, or ПМЖ pe-em-žé
- Saint Kitts and Nevis
- Singapore
- South Africa
- South Korea: called 영주권 yeongjugwon
- Switzerland: called Settlement Permit (Permis d'établissement, Niederlassungsbewilligung or Permesso di domicilio), commonly referred to as a C Permit (Permis C, C-Ausweis or Permesso C)
- Thailand
- Trinidad and Tobago
- Ukraine: called посвідка на постійне проживання posvidka na postijne prozhyvannya, or ППП "pe-pe-pe"
- United Kingdom: either through Indefinite leave to remain or Right of Abode or Permanent Residence for EEA nationals
- United States: lawfully admitted for permanent residence
- Vanuatu
- Vietnam

== Non-standard forms of permanent residency ==
=== Former citizens or persons of origin ===
Some countries grant residency and other specific rights to former citizens or persons of origin in the country:

India does not permit dual citizenship, but former Indian citizens, and persons of Indian origin, are eligible to apply for an Overseas Citizen of India (OCI) card that allows them to live and work freely in India, apart from running for certain political office posts and occupying constitutional posts. They also cannot vote or buy agricultural land. Spouses who have no other connection to India other than being married to someone with or eligible for OCI can also apply for OCI if they have been married for at least two years. If the marriage be dissolved, OCI status would be automatically lost for the spouse with no connection to India. In 2016, India allowed Permanent Resident Status to foreigners with some conditions.

Turkey allows dual citizenship, and former Turkish citizens by birth who have given up their Turkish citizenship with permission (for example, because they have naturalized in a country that usually does not permit dual citizenship) and their descendants subject to certain conditions, can apply for the Blue Card (Mavi Kart), which gives most of the citizens' rights back, e.g. the right to live and work in Turkey, the right to possess land or the right to inherit, but not the right to vote or the right to be employed as a public servant.

=== Treaties ===
Some countries have made treaties regulating travel and access to the job markets (non-government/non-military-related work)

- A citizen of an EU country can live and work indefinitely in other EU countries and in Iceland, Liechtenstein, Norway, and Switzerland (and citizens of these countries can live and work in EU countries). Permanent residence is acquired automatically after five years of residence.
- The Trans-Tasman Travel Arrangement between Australia and New Zealand allows citizens of the two countries to live and work indefinitely in the other country, but the status is distinct from permanent residence in the country and expires each time a holder leaves the country. Despite this, the time a New Zealander spends in Australia on a Special Category Visa may count as permanent residence the purpose of acquiring citizenship.
- A citizen of a Gulf Cooperation Council (GCC) member state (Bahrain, Kuwait, Oman, Qatar, Saudi Arabia, and the United Arab Emirates) can live and work in other member states.

However, for voting, being voted and working for the public sector or the national security in a country, citizenship of the country concerned is almost always required.

=== Investments ===
A "golden visa" is a permanent residency visa issued to individuals who invest, often through the purchase of property, a certain sum of money into the issuing country. Dating back to the 1980s, golden visas became much more popular and available in the 21st century. Golden visas require investments of anywhere from $100,000 in Dominica up to £2,000,000 in the UK. The most common method for obtaining a golden visa is through the purchase of real estate with a minimum value. Some countries such as Cyprus and Malta also offer golden passports to individuals if they invest a certain sum. The issuing of so-called "golden visas" has sparked controversy in several countries.

Since the 1990s, some countries have begun to offer golden passports - which give citizenship as well as residency rights - to foreign nationals who invest (often through the purchase of real estate properties) a certain sum into the issuing country's economy. The issuing of EU passports by Cyprus and Malta has sparked controversy but is expected to produce billions of euros in revenue for the issuing countries.

== Limitations of permanent residents ==
Depending on the country, permanent residents usually have the same rights as citizens except for the following:

- They may not vote (though in some cases such as the UK's Commonwealth citizens, and in New Zealand voting is allowed. Hong Kong and Macau allow permanent residents to vote regardless of nationality).
- They may not stand for public office (except European Union citizens permanently residing in other EU member states who may stand in local and European elections). UK's Commonwealth citizens can stand for public office if they have Indefinite Leave to Remain.
- In most cases, they may not hold public sector employment. Canada and New Zealand allow this; some countries, such as Brazil and Portugal, allow it only for permanent residents holding citizenship of certain countries.
- They may not usually apply for employment involving national security. In Singapore, male PRs who have been granted PR before the age of 18 have to serve national service. Most first-generation males are exempted.
- They may not own certain types of real estate.
- They are not issued the passport of that country (unless otherwise stateless or unable to obtain a passport from their country of nationality, in which case they may be entitled to a certificate of identity instead).
- They do not have access to the country's consular protection (some countries such as Australia allow this).
- They may qualify to apply for citizenship after meeting a specified period of residence.

== Obligations of permanent residents ==
Permanent residents may be required to fulfill specific residence obligations to maintain their status. In some cases, permanent residency may be conditional on a certain type of employment or maintenance of a business.

Many countries have compulsory military service for citizens. Some countries, such as Singapore, extend this to permanent residents. However, in Singapore, most first generation permanent residents are exempted, and only their sons are held liable for national service.

In a similar approach, the United States has Selective Service, a compulsory registration for military service, which is required of all male citizens and permanent residents ages 18 to 26; this requirement theoretically applies even to those residing in the country illegally. Applications for citizenship may be denied or otherwise impeded if the applicant cannot prove having complied with this requirement.

Permanent residents may be required to reside in the country offering them residence for a given minimum length of time (as in Australia and Canada). Permanent residents may lose their status if they stay outside their host country for more than a specified period of time (as in the United States).

Permanent residents have the same obligations as citizens regarding taxes.

== Loss of status ==
Permanent residents may lose their status if they fail to comply with residency or other obligations imposed on them. For example:

- They leave the country beyond a maximum number of days (varies among countries but usually more than 2 years).
- They become a threat to national security, or they commit serious crimes and become subject to deportation or removal from the country.

== Access to citizenship ==
Usually, permanent residents may apply for citizenship by naturalization after a period of permanent residency (typically five years) in the country concerned. Dual/multiple citizenship may or may not be permitted.

In many nations, an application for naturalization can be denied on character grounds, sometimes allowing people to reside in the country (as non-domiciled) but not become citizens. In the United States, the residency requirements for citizenship are normally five years, even though permanent residents who have been married to a U.S. citizen for three years or more may apply in three years. Those who have served in the armed forces may qualify for an expedited process allowing citizenship after only one year, or even without any residence requirement.

== Automatic entitlement ==
Full permanent residence rights are granted automatically between the following:

- Ireland and the United Kingdom, including general election voting rights.
- The states of the Nordic Council.
- The Republic of Belarus and the Russian Federation.
- The Republic of India and the Federal Democratic Republic of Nepal.
- Brazil grants permanent residence for Argentines and Uruguayans from start (they may choose both temporary or permanent).

In some cases (e.g. the member states of the European Union), citizens of participating countries can live and work at will in each other's states, but don't have a status fully equivalent to that of a permanent resident. In particular, under the Trans-Tasman Travel Arrangement, Australia and New Zealand grant each other's citizens the right to reside permanently and work in each country; however, the rights and entitlements of New Zealanders living in Australia under this arrangement (the so-called Special Category Visa) are somewhat short of those of Australian permanent residents, in particular with respect to unemployment benefits and similar benefits.

== Proof of permanent residency ==
People who are granted permanent residency in a country are usually issued some sort of documentary evidence as legal proof of this status. In the past, many countries merely stamped the person's passport indicating that the holder was admitted as a permanent resident or that he/she was exempt from immigration control and permitted to work without restriction. Other countries would issue a photo ID card, place a visa sticker or certificate of residence in the person's passport, or issue a letter to confirm their permanent resident status.

- In Argentina, the non-citizens are issued an Argentine "DNI", with the same characteristics for Argentinian citizens, showing back additional data saying the origin country and filling date.
- In Australia and New Zealand, a printout of permanent residence visa or resident visa is stuck to a page of the permanent resident's passport (on 1 September 2015, Australia ceased issuing visa labels to holders of Australian visas).
- In Canada, permanent residents are issued a photo ID card known as Permanent Resident Card. They are also given an official document called a Confirmation of Permanent Residence or Record of Landing on the day that permanent resident status is conferred.
- In Costa Rica, permanent residents are issued a photo ID card commonly referred to as a "cedula".
- In the countries of the European Union, residency permits are a photo ID card following a common EU design.
- In Germany, resident permits (Aufenthaltstitel) have been issued as photo ID cards following a common EU design since 1 September 2011. Prior to that date, residence permits were stickers (similar to visas) which were affixed to the resident's passport.
- In Ghana, permanent residents are issued an Indefinite Residence permit which is in the form of a sticker attached into the resident's passport.
- In Hong Kong, permanent residents are issued a Hong Kong Permanent Identity Card.
- In Japan and South Korea, all resident foreigners are issued a residence card, and for permanent residents this status is indicated.
- In Lithuania, permanent residents are issued a photo ID (Leidimas gyventi) following a common EU design.
- In Macao, permanent residents are issued a Macao Permanent Resident Identity Card (Bilhete de Identidade de Residente Permanente).
- In Malaysia, permanent residents are issued with a MyPR card similar to the MyKad issued to Malaysian citizens, the difference being the colour (red instead of blue) and additional information stating the cardholder's country of origin.
- In the Republic of China (Taiwan), permanent residents are issued a blue photo ID card (APRC). A separate open work permit can also be issued to permanent residents allowing them to accept employment in any non-governmental positions for which they are qualified.
- In Singapore, permanent residents are issued a blue identity card with their photograph, thumb print and other personal particulars similar to citizen's pink identity card
- In Slovakia, permanent residents were used to issued a red photo ID. Slovakia has switched to common EU design since 2011.
- In South Africa, permanent residents who have their passport endorsed, are issued a certificate and a standard national green identity book showing "NON S.A. CITIZEN".
- In Switzerland, permanent residents are issued either a biometric ID card in accordance with Schengen regulations if they are non EU/EFTA national, or a paper permit in a yellow-coloured plastic wallet if they are an EU/EFTA national.
- In the United Kingdom, the applicant is issued with a photo ID card known as a Biometric Residence Permit which states that the permit is a Settlement permit for Indefinite Leave to Remain.
- In the United States, permanent residents are issued a photo ID card which is known as a Permanent Resident Card (or simply as a "green card"). Federal law requires that the card be carried on the person at all times.

== Brexit ==
The European Union Settlement Scheme is a scheme launched in 2019 by the UK Home Office to process the registration of EU citizens resident in the United Kingdom prior to its departure from the European Union.

Successful applicants receive either 'Pre-settled status' or 'Settled status', depending on the length of time they have been resident in the United Kingdom.

== See also ==
- Civitas sine suffragio
- Denization
- Domicile (law)
- Habitual residence
- Immigration
- Long-term resident (European Union)
- Metic
- Nationality law
- Temporary residency in Canada
