= Visa requirements for crew members =

Administrative entry restrictions

Visa requirements for crew members are administrative entry restrictions imposed by countries on members of a ship or aircraft crew during transit.

These requirements for permission to enter a territory for a short duration and perform their predefined duties in the given areas are distinct from actual formal permission for an alien to enter and remain in a territory.

The validity of transit visas for crew members are usually limited to short terms such as several hours to 10 days depending on the size of the country and the circumstances. Visa policies for crew members are set by the country and apply during transit or when joining the vessel or aircraft. It is usually illegal for crew members to perform repairs or do similar work without work permits when either in port, or when travelling in territorial waters. A few countries offer a visa waiver program or do not issue a crew visa, but allow entry for a limited time with mandatory clearance documents.

== Overview ==
An application for a crew visa in advance of arrival may grant non-citizens clearance to enter a country and remain there within specified constraints and regions without prohibiting employment. Crew members are typically required to enter or exit the country with the aircraft, train, or ship they work on.

Many countries mandate that crew members obtain relevant crew visas. As a result, crew members often carry second passports: one for visa submissions and another as a backup in case of a short-notice trip. Crew visas can be obtained directly from embassies, but many companies utilize third-party providers to expedite the application process for multi-entry visas.

This category includes pilots, flight attendants, sailors, and other employees on board a vessel whose services are essential for its normal operation.

== Visa requirements ==
Country	Visa requirement	Notes
Australia	Visa required	Australia offers a Transit visa, Subclass 771 that crew member and their dependents transit through the country for 72 hours. The crew members are also required to produce a police certificate from each country they have lived in for 12 months or more during the last 10 years after turning to 16 years of age.
Brazil	Visa not required	A transit visa is not required through Rio de Janeiro Galeao International or Sao Paulo Guarulhos. The crew member must carry a valid passport with a validity of at least 6 months with 2 blank visa pages and all necessary documents for the next destination.
Canada	Visa not required	Flight crew flying into Canada while on duty do not require a visa- or an eTA, in case of visa-exempt nationalities other than the US- to enter the country. The length of stay for commercial aircrew is a maximum of 48 hours.
China	Visa required	A crew member employed on board in China needs a crew visa, C Visa. The visa is issued to foreign crew members and their family members engaged in cross-border transport activities. They are required to enter into or exit from China with the aircraft, train or ship they are crew for. They are required to complete one visa application form V.2013 per person, and produce their actual passport, photograph, an introduction letter from the employer on business letterhead, a copy of employee ID and other relevant documents. A five-year multiple-entry visa is only issued to US passport holders. Otherwise, the multiple entry visa is valid for a period of 2 years.
France	Visa required	Visa on arrival if holding a valid visa or permanent resident card for the US or Canada. France has free visa policy for all countries except Albania, Mongolia, Belize, Samoa, Bhutan, St Kitts & Nevis, Dominica, Tuvalu, Hong Kong, Israel and United States of America. The crew members from these countries require a circulation visa valid for one year and American and Israeli crew members visa is valid for five years with respect to reciprocity. During the time of application, the passport validity must exceed by at least 3 months.
Germany	Visa required	The crew member who has Schengen visa is free to transit from Germany. The German Embassy can receive visa applications from accredited shipping agencies and airlines, where crew member need has to establish his identity as a traveler and declare the purpose of his visit.
India	Visa required	The Embassy of India does not issue a crew visa directly, however it is issued by Indian missions and posts. Pilots and crew members are required to needing prior clearance from authorities in India which includes, landing permit issued by the DGCA, ICAO issued by the FAA, Certificate of Incorporation of the airline or cargo operator, Letter of Invitation, business letter and address proof. A landing permit facility, up to a maximum of 72 hours, can be given to a foreigner who enters India by Air or Sea, without a valid visa, under emergent condition connected with or relevant to an event or action.
Indonesia	Visa not required	Passport holders from Visa free countries who wish to enter Indonesia for the transit can do so without visa through all air, sea or land crossing points.
Japan	Visa required	The crew members are required to present a business letter from their company mentioning purpose of the trip, a financial guarantee statement, specify applicant's position, annual salary and employment term. A letter of invitation from the Japan’s company office is also required to visit in Japan.
Sri Lanka	Visa not required	Crew members of flights & ships do not require a visa in Sri Lanka. It offers free visa policy to the crew members for all countries.
United States	Visa required	A crew member serving on board in the United States needs a crew visa C-1, D, C1/D or a modified B-1 visa, except for citizens of Canada. To apply for a crew visa, the crew members must demonstrate purpose of their trip is solely for transit or crew purposes, not to be paid by a U.S. source, stay for a limited period of time and have evidence of funds to cover all expenses during the stay.
United Kingdom	Visa required	UK Visas and Immigration department offers CRM01 for seafarers and CRM02 for Aircrew. The immigration act 1971 cover seafarers under Section 8(1) and aircrew under Section 33(1). The aircrew members must have a valid passport, authorized crew member certificate or a pilot’s licence. The security guards, trainee crew members and loadmasters in the country are not considered as operating crew and they need applicable visa to work as a crew. EEA nationals coming on a short term visit are not subject to restrictions, they need only either a National Identity Card or a passport.
Vietnam	Visa not required	The Embassy of Vietnam also does not issue a crew visa, the crew member needs to provide a letter on the company letterhead describing the purpose of their trip, dates of entry and exit and providing a financial guarantee, signed by a company representative. Vietnam has visa exemptions policy for the flight crew members of 12 countries including United States, Qatar, Uzbekistan, Japan, Australia, Russia, Hong Kong, South Korea, France, Kazakhstan, Poland and Luxembourg. The Visa exemption policy for flight crew members was first put into force in 2002.

== Non-visa restrictions ==
=== Blank passport pages ===
Many countries require a minimum number of blank pages to be available in the passport being presented, typically one or two pages. Endorsement pages, which often appear after the visa pages, are not counted as being valid or available.

=== Vaccination ===
Cover of the new International Certificate of Vaccination issued by the Bureau of Quarantine in the Philippines since 2021

The African countries of Angola, Benin, Burkina Faso, Burundi, Cameroon, Central African Republic, Chad, Democratic Republic of the Congo, Republic of the Congo, Côte d'Ivoire, Equatorial Guinea, Gabon, Gambia, Ghana, Guinea-Bissau, Kenya, Liberia, Mali, Mauritania, Niger, Rwanda, Senegal, Sierra Leone and Togo, South Sudan, Uganda, and Zambia, require all incoming passengers older than nine months to one year to have a current International Certificate of Vaccination or Prophylaxis, as does the South American territory of French Guiana.

Some other countries require vaccination only if the passenger is coming from an infected area or has visited one recently or has transited for 12 hours in those countries: Algeria, Botswana, Cabo Verde, Chad, Djibouti, Egypt, Eswatini, Ethiopia, Gambia, Ghana, Guinea, Lesotho, Libya, Equatorial Guinea, Eritrea, Madagascar, Malawi, Mauritania, Mauritius, Mozambique, Namibia, Nigeria, Papua New Guinea, Seychelles, Somalia, South Africa, Sudan, Tunisia, Uganda, United Republic of Tanzania, Zambia and Zimbabwe.

=== Passport validity length ===
Very few countries, such as Paraguay, just require a valid passport on arrival.

However many countries and groupings now require only an identity card – especially from their neighbours. Other countries may have special bilateral arrangements that depart from the generality of their passport validity length policies to shorten the period of passport validity required for each other's citizens or even accept passports that have already expired (but not been cancelled).

Some countries, such as Japan, Ireland and the United Kingdom, require a passport valid throughout the period of the intended stay.

In the absence of specific bilateral agreements, countries requiring passports to be valid for at least 6 more months on arrival include Afghanistan, Algeria, Anguilla, Bahrain, Bhutan, Botswana, British Virgin Islands, Brunei, Cambodia, Cameroon, Cape Verde, Cayman Islands, Central African Republic, Chad, Comoros, Costa Rica, Côte d'Ivoire, Curaçao, Ecuador, Egypt, El Salvador, Equatorial Guinea, Fiji, Gabon, Guinea Bissau, Guyana, Haiti, India, Indonesia, Iran, Iraq, Israel, Jordan, Kenya, Kiribati, Kuwait, Laos, Madagascar, Malaysia, Marshall Islands, Mongolia, Myanmar, Namibia, Nepal, Nicaragua, Nigeria, Oman, Palau, Papua New Guinea, Peru, Philippines, Qatar, Rwanda, Samoa, Saudi Arabia, Singapore, Solomon Islands, Somalia, Sri Lanka, Sudan, Suriname, Tanzania, Thailand, Timor-Leste, Tokelau, Tonga, Turkey, Tuvalu, Uganda, United Arab Emirates, Vanuatu, Venezuela, and Vietnam.

Countries requiring passports valid for at least 4 months on arrival include Micronesia and Zambia.

Countries requiring passports with a validity of at least 3 months beyond the date of intended departure include Azerbaijan, Bosnia and Herzegovina, Honduras, Montenegro, Nauru, Moldova and New Zealand. Similarly, the EEA countries of Iceland, Liechtenstein, Norway, all European Union countries (except Ireland) together with Switzerland also require 3 months validity beyond the date of the bearer's intended departure unless the bearer is an EEA or Swiss national.

Countries requiring passports valid for at least 3 months on arrival include Albania, North Macedonia, Panama, and Senegal.

Bermuda requires passports to be valid for at least 45 days upon entry.

Countries that require a passport validity of at least one month beyond the date of intended departure include Eritrea, Hong Kong, Lebanon, Macau, the Maldives and South Africa.

==== Maximum passport age ====
Countries of the Schengen area require non-EU passports to be less than 10 years old upon entry. A number of holders of British passports, which until September 2018 could be issued with a validity period of up to 10 years and nine months if the previous passport was not expired, were unable to travel to the EU subsequent to Brexit due to this restriction.

=== Criminal record ===
Some countries, including Australia, Canada, Fiji, New Zealand and the United States, routinely deny entry to non-citizens who have a criminal record, while others impose restrictions depending on the type of conviction and the length of the sentence.

=== Persona non grata ===
The government of a country can declare a diplomat persona non grata, banning them from entering the country or expelling them if they have already entered. In non-diplomatic use, the authorities of a country may also declare a foreigner persona non grata permanently or temporarily, usually because of unlawful activity.

=== Israeli stamps ===
Kuwait, Lebanon, Libya, and Yemen do not allow entry to people with passport stamps from Israel or whose passports have either a used or an unused Israeli visa, or where there is evidence of previous travel to Israel such as entry or exit stamps from neighbouring border posts in transit countries such as Jordan and Egypt.

To circumvent this Arab League boycott of Israel, the Israeli immigration services have now mostly ceased to stamp foreign nationals' passports on either entry to or exit from Israel (unless the entry is for some work-related purposes). Since 15 January 2013, Israel no longer stamps foreign passports at Ben Gurion Airport. Passports are still (as of 22 June 2017) stamped at Erez when passing into and out of Gaza.

Iran refuses admission to holders of passports containing an Israeli visa or stamp that is less than 12 months old.

=== Biometrics ===
Several countries mandate that all travellers, or all foreign travellers, be fingerprinted on arrival and will refuse admission to or even arrest travellers who refuse to comply. In some countries, such as the United States, this may apply even to transit passengers who merely wish to change planes rather than go landside.

Fingerprinting countries/regions include Afghanistan, Argentina, Brunei, Cambodia, China, Ethiopia, Ghana, Guinea, India, Japan, Kenya (both fingerprints and a photo are taken), Malaysia upon entry and departure, Mongolia, Saudi Arabia, Singapore, South Korea, Taiwan, Thailand, Uganda, the United Arab Emirates and the United States.

Many countries also require a photo be taken of people entering the country. The United States, which does not fully implement exit control formalities at its land frontiers (although long mandated by its own legislation), intends to implement facial recognition for passengers departing from international airports to identify people who overstay their visa.

Together with fingerprint and face recognition, iris scanning is one of three biometric identification technologies internationally standardised since 2006 by the International Civil Aviation Organization (ICAO) for use in e-passports and the United Arab Emirates conducts iris scanning on visitors who need to apply for a visa. The United States Department of Homeland Security has announced plans to greatly increase the biometric data it collects at US borders. In 2018, Singapore began trials of iris scanning at three land and maritime immigration checkpoints.
