= Temporary protection visa =

Australian visa category

A Temporary Protection Visa (TPV) is an Australian visa category issued to persons who had been recognised as refugees fleeing persecution. TPVs are issued to persons who apply for refugee status after making an unauthorised arrival in Australia, and is the main type of visa issued to refugees when released from Australian immigration detention facilities. TPVs were initially introduced by the Howard government on 20 October 1999, abolished by the Rudd government in August 2008, and reintroduced by the Abbott government in October 2013.

After being granted a TPV, refugees are required to reapply after three years, in case conditions change in their homeland. TPV holders are eligible for only some of the special settlement services funded by the Commonwealth to assist new arrivals in Australia. Unlike permanent visa (PV) holders, TPV recipients have no family reunion rights and no right to re-enter the country if they depart Australia. TPV holders do have the right to work and have access to job matching by Centrelink. They are also eligible for Special Benefit, Rent Assistance, Family Tax Benefit, Child Care Benefit, Medicare, Early Health Assessment and Intervention Program, torture and trauma counselling, and English as a second language classes (for TPV minors only).

== Criticism and abolition ==
The scheme was controversial, with the government claiming it was a necessary response to the misuse of the asylum process by unauthorised arrivals. Refugee advocates described TPVs as a cruel way to treat people which left asylum seekers with an uncertain future. The granting of a TPV prevents a refugee from applying for permanent protection.

The Rudd government committed itself to abolition of TPVs as part of its Budget 2008–09 announcements made in May 2008. The regulations providing for the granting of permanent protection visas (PPVs) to all refugees who had established a claim for protection in Australia were introduced into the federal Parliament in August 2008. From that date, a person applying in Australia for refugee protection was granted a PPV. Individuals who held a TPV became eligible to apply for a Resolution of Status Visa, which was akin to a PPV, which was granted subject to the TPV applicant undergoing health and ASIO/AFP security checks.

== Re-instatement ==
On 18 October 2013, the Abbott government announced the re-instatement of the TPVs. On 2 December 2013, Labor and the Greens voted in the Senate to disallow the return of TPVs.

On 11 September 2014 the High Court ruled the issuing of TPVs without the appropriate legislative powers invalid. To overcome the High Court objections, on 5 December 2014, legislation was passed to reintroduce TPVs to specifically deal with the backlog of 30,000 asylum seekers yet to be processed left by the former Labor government. The legislation was passed by the Coalition government with support of the cross bench in the Senate.

== See also ==
- Special Category Visa
- Temporary Protection Directive – European Union counterpart
- Temporary protected status – United States counterpart
