= Australian migration zone =

Territory in which Australia's visa policy applies

Australian migration zone

The Australian migration zone is a legal device created by the Australian Government for the purpose of Australia's visa policy and immigration policy, as the territory in which Australia's visa policy applies.

== Background and overview ==
The Australian migration zone covers such Australian controlled territories as the government may determine. Prior to 2001, the Australian migration zone consisted of the mainland, as well as some external territories. Norfolk Island, for example, was not part of the Australian migration zone until 2016.

Under Australia's universal visa policy, a non-citizen must hold an Australian visa within the Australian migration zone. Without such a visa, or a bridging visa, the non-citizen is an unlawful non-citizen and treated as an "unauthorised arrival". However, the main effect of the migration zone is that unauthorised arrivals outside the zone have very limited access for review by Australian courts.

In the Australian government’s strategy to stem the flow of unauthorised arrivals into Australia, in September 2001, the government passed the Migration Amendment (Excision from Migration Zone) Act 2001 and the Migration Amendment (Excision from Migration Zone) (Consequential Provisions) Act 2001 which removed ("excised") a number of external territories from the Australian migration zone. The excised territories included Ashmore, Cartier, Christmas and Cocos Islands, which lie in the Indian Ocean between Indonesia and Australia. The effect of the change was to limit the ability of unauthorised arrivals arriving there, termed "offshore entry persons", to apply for a visa on arrival. However, the Minister was still empowered to grant a visa to such persons “in the public interest”. In 2010, a landmark High Court ruled that the processing procedures on Christmas Island were unlawful and unconstitutional.

After these territories were excised, increasing numbers of asylum seekers attempted to reach the Australian mainland by-passing those islands. To combat this tactic, on 30 October 2012, the Australian government excised the entire Australian mainland from the Australian migration zone. The objective of the change was to limit judicial review for boat arrivals. The legislation to excise the mainland itself from the migration zone was passed by Parliament on 16 May 2013. Before the excise, asylum seekers who reached the mainland by boat could not be sent for immigration processing to offshore Australian immigration detention facilities on Nauru or Papua New Guinea's Manus Island.

The excising of islands from the Australian migration zone was and remains a controversial aspect of Australian immigration policy. Refugee advocates argue that Australia is not meeting its obligations under international law to protect refugees. This was not accepted by the Howard government, which contended that international law obliged Australia to provide temporary protection only and not necessarily permanent settlement.

== Effect on unauthorised arrivals ==
The Australian government claims that in the excised areas Australia has no obligation to grant asylum seekers a visa to settle permanently in Australia (as opposed to temporary protection). The main objective of excising areas from the Australian migration zone is to limit access of unauthorised arrivals to review by Australian courts. Asylum seekers who land in an excised area may only apply for refugee status with the UNHCR.

The Acts also included the powers to move unauthorised arrivals to another country where their claim for protection could be considered. Under this authority, thousands of asylum seekers have been moved to off-shore immigration detention facilities on Christmas Island, Nauru, and Manus Island.

In subsequent years, the government excised other islands, sometimes attempting to do so retroactively, after asylum seekers had already landed.

However, the Rudd government abolished the temporary protection visa scheme in 2008. The practice of diverting boat-borne arrivals to Christmas Island remained, effectively disallowing judicial review.

On 16 May 2013, the Australian Parliament passed an Act to effectively excise the entire Australian mainland from the migration zone.

== Legal implications of excision ==
At times, there has been confusion over the effect on Australia's sovereignty over the excised area. Various constitution authorities have voiced the opinion that excising territory from the migration zone does not affect Australia's sovereignty.

The "excision" of areas from the migration zone has no effect on the rights of Australian citizens and permanent residents to travel to and remain in that area, and no documentation is required to travel between these areas and the rest of Australia. Nor is there any effect on the rights of those non-citizens who arrive in these territories with valid visas.

== Bringing Norfolk Island within the zone ==
Norfolk Island, an Australian external territory, was brought within the Australian migration zone on 1 July 2016. From that date, anyone living on Norfolk Island needed to be an Australian citizen or hold a visa under the Australian Migration Act 1958, and all island legislation on the matter ceased to apply. The Department of Immigration and Border Protection became responsible for administering the system and non-citizen permit holders (except those holding visitor permits) or permanent residents of Norfolk Island were given comparable Australian visa categories. However, a new temporary visa, called Provisional Resident Return visa (subclass 159) was created for those persons who held a work permit for Norfolk Island, who were then only entitled to work on Norfolk Island, and not the rest of Australia.

== See also ==
- Visa policy of Australia
- Australian permanent resident
- Mandatory detention in Australia
- Pacific Solution
- Permanent Resident of Norfolk Island visa
