= Australian New Zealanders =

Ethnic group in New Zealand

Total population
- 86,322 (by birth, 2023 census); 22,467 (by Australian ancestry, 2023); 1,161 (by Indigenous ancestry, 2023)

Regions with significant populations
- Australian-born people by region
- Auckland: 19,593
- Canterbury: 8,520
- Wellington: 6,915
- Waikato: 6,096
- Bay of Plenty: 4,194
- Otago: 3,897

Languages
- English, Australian Aboriginal languages

Related ethnic groups
- Australian diaspora

Australian New Zealanders are New Zealanders whose origins are in Australia, as well as Australian migrants and expatriates based in New Zealand.

== History and relationship ==
New Zealand and Australia were both colonised by Britain and remain members of the commonwealth. New Zealand was originally constitutionally recognised as an extension of the New South Wales colony until it became a separate colony in 1841. New Zealand declined to join the Australian federation in 1901, however, the two countries' political alliance remained strong. It was not until the 1990s that New Zealand and Australia gained formal government ties again, sitting on the Council of Australian Governments from 1992, entering the Trans-Tasman Mutual Recognition Arrangement from 1998 and creating the National Federation Reforms Council in 2020. Today Australia and New Zealand are both one of each other's strongest bilateral relationships.

== Demographics ==
The migration of citizens between Australia and New Zealand has been steady since the 1800s. Many of the early New Zealand Settlers came from Australia. In the 1860s there was a big influx of Australians moving to New Zealand in pursuit of gold mining.

In the early 2010s an average of 27,000 New Zealanders per year moved to Australia. By the late 2010s this yearly average decreased to 3,000 New Zealanders moving to Australia. There have only been a few occasions that the migration flow has leaned towards New Zealand gaining; December 2014, September 2015, December 2016, December 2017. From December 2019 until September 2020 New Zealand had a consistent higher influx of Australians moving to New Zealand than New Zealanders moving to Australia. The COVID-19 Pandemic could have had an effect on this as New Zealand was experiences far less positive cases and lockdowns than some Australian cities during this time.

In March 2021 New Zealanders moving to Australia made up 70% of the countries migration departures.

=== Australian ethnic group ===
There were 29,349 people identifying as being part of the Australian ethnic group at the 2018 New Zealand census, making up 0.62% of New Zealand's population. This is an increase of 6,879 people (30.6%) since the 2013 census, and an increase of 3,079 people (11.7%) since the 2006 census. Some of the increase between the 2013 and 2018 census was due to Statistics New Zealand adding ethnicity data from other sources (previous censuses, administrative data, and imputation) to the 2018 census data to reduce the number of non-responses.

There were 13,530 males and 15,816 females, giving a sex ratio of 0.855 males per female. The median was 38.8 years, compared to 37.4 years for all New Zealanders; 5,589 people (19.0%) were aged under 15 years, 5,121 (17.4%) were 15 to 29, 14,544 (49.6%) were 30 to 64, and 4,092 (13.9%) were 65 or older.

In terms of population distribution, 71.8% live in the North Island and 28.2% live in the South Island. The Queenstown-Lakes District has the highest concentration of Australian-ethnic people at 2.2%, followed by Waiheke Island (1.9%) and the Great Barrier Island (1.4%). The Māngere-Ōtāhuhu local board area of Auckland had the lowest concentration of Australian-ethnic people at 0.15%, followed by the Ōtara-Papatoetoe local board area (0.27%) and the Manurewa local board area (0.27%), The Wairoa district had the lowest concentration of Australian-ethnic people outside Auckland at 0.36%.

=== Australia birthplace ===
There were 75,810 people in New Zealand born in Australia at the 2018 New Zealand census. This is an increase of 13,098 people (20.9%) since the 2013 census, and an increase of 13,068 people (20.8%) since the 2006 census.

There were 35,859 males and 39,948 females, giving a sex ratio of 0.898 males per female. Of the population, 17,475 people (23.1%) were aged under 15 years, 16,869 (22.3%) were 15 to 29, 31,686 (41.8%) were 30 to 64, and 9,780 (12.9%) were 65 or older.

== Legalities ==
Australians do not need a visa to visit New Zealand however it is very easy for Australians who decide to stay in New Zealand for longer periods of time to obtain a visa. Australian citizens and permanent Australian residents can apply for a permanent resident visa to live, work and study in New Zealand. This visa has to be applied for once on New Zealand territory. The visa is guaranteed on arrival. A good character assessment will also be conducted which assesses a person based on criminal history, have any exclusions from any other countries, or if New Zealand has reason to believe the person is of risk to its security. Failure to meet the good character assessment can result in the rejection of permanent resident visa and a ban on entering New Zealand. There is no cost in applying or obtaining the permanent resident visa for an Australian citizen or Australian permanent resident. After being a permanent resident for 5 years an Australian can apply for citizenship, either sole citizenship or dual citizenship with Australia. To obtain New Zealand citizenship, a person must pass a character assessment again, an English language requirement and prove they have been present in New Zealand for 5 years.

Australians who are eligible for Aged Pension payments can continue to claim them when working and living in New Zealand. New Zealand and Australia have a social security agreement that allows for this by counting the working period of a person from both countries.

An Australian citizen who lives in New Zealand is also eligible for New Zealand's super scheme KiwiSaver. KiwiSaver requires a contribution from an employee's wage of which the employer will match, the government will also contribute annually. When starting a job in New Zealand an employer will automatically enrol them into the scheme. Any money obtained in the Australian super system can be transferred over to KiwiSaver. As an Australian, all income obtained from New Zealand's workforce is also subject to New Zealand's income tax. Australians working in New Zealand will need to apply for an IRD number (Inland Revenue Department) which will act as a tax file number.

Being an Australian citizen or permanent resident allows access to New Zealand's publicly funded health care system on one condition. An Australian must demonstrate an intention to stay on New Zealand for at least two years. If an Australian resident does not intend to stay for two years they only have access to the emergency, maternity and pharmaceutical services. All other services including GP visits will need to be paid for in full and up front. This is often referred to as the casual rate.

Australian citizens who attend an education institution in New Zealand are classified as domestic students and therefore only pay the local fees. A vast majority of primary and secondary schools are free in New Zealand. Tertiary fees for Australians are the same as New Zealanders however Australians can only apply for Student Loans and Student Allowances if they have lived in New Zealand for three years at least.

Purchasing a property or renting in New Zealand is the same for Australians as it is for New Zealanders if the Australians plans to reside in said property. If an Australian wants to buy property in New Zealand and does not plan to live there they will be need to apply for consent under New Zealand's Overseas Investment Regulations. Anyone over the age of 18 who are permanent residents of New Zealand or have lived in New Zealand for one year continuously in their life are required to vote in the New Zealand government elections.

Australians in New Zealand are eligible for all WINZ payments. They become eligible for tertiary student allowances after two years and can apply for citizenship after five years.

== See also ==
- European New Zealanders
- Australia–New Zealand relations
- Europeans in Oceania
- Immigration to New Zealand
- New Zealander Australians
