= Trans-Tasman Travel Arrangement =

Arrangement between Australia and New Zealand

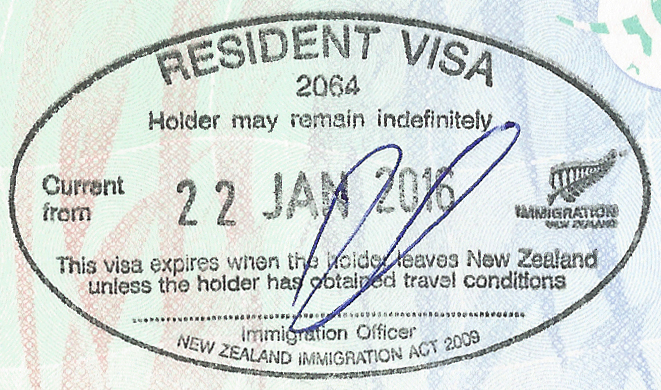
A New Zealand resident visa stamp granted on arrival under Trans-Tasman Travel Arrangement on an Australian travel document.

The Trans-Tasman Travel Arrangement (TTTA) is an arrangement between Australia and New Zealand which allows for the free movement of citizens of one of these countries to the other. The arrangement came into effect in 1973, and allows citizens of each country to reside and work in the other country indefinitely, with some restrictions. Other details of the arrangement have varied over time. From 1 July 1981, all people entering Australia (including New Zealand citizens) have been required to carry a passport. Since 1 September 1994, Australia has had a universal visa requirement, and to specifically cater for the continued free movement of New Zealanders to Australia the Special Category Visa was introduced for New Zealanders.

New Zealand's arrangement extends also to Australian permanent residents or resident return visa holders.

== History ==
Countries in the Trans-Tasman Travel Arrangement

The arrangement was announced on 4 February 1973 and came into effect soon after. The arrangement is not expressed in the form of any binding bilateral treaty between Australia and New Zealand, but rather is a series of immigration procedures applied by each country and underpinned by joint political support. Although the exact nature of the arrangement has been varied from time to time, it still allows citizens of Australia or New Zealand to live in the other country indefinitely and take on most employment. New Zealand citizens who are not also Australian citizens may not work in Australia in areas involving national security or in the Australian Public Service. The arrangement itself is linked to and grounded by a system of other agreements and treaties such as the New Zealand Australia Free Trade Agreement (1966), Australia New Zealand Closer Economic Relations Trade Agreement (1983), Trans-Tasman Mutual Recognition Arrangement (1998), various Social Security agreements between Australia and New Zealand (1994, 1995, 1998 and 2002), Australia and New Zealand Standard Classification of Occupations (2006), SmartGate (2007) and Trans-Tasman Patent Attorney Regime (2013).

=== Pre-1973 procedures and introduction of the Arrangement ===
Prior to 1973, neither New Zealand nor Australia exercised systematic control over immigration from the main Commonwealth countries (principally the United Kingdom and Canada), and New Zealanders and Australians were thus free to move between each country under informal arrangements.

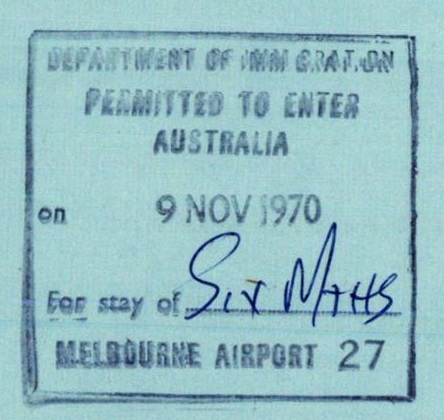
An Australian visa stamp on a New Zealand travel document.

On 22 January 1973, the Prime Ministers of Australia and New Zealand (Gough Whitlam and Norman Kirk respectively) announced the basis for what would become known as the Trans-Tasman Travel Arrangement (or TTTA) in a joint communiqué that covered a wide range of issues including economic and defence cooperation, travel, South Pacific affairs, race relations and nuclear weapons testing. With regards to travel, the two Prime Ministers agreed that citizens of each country and citizens of other Commonwealth countries who had resident status in either Australia or New Zealand should henceforth be able to travel between Australia and New Zealand, for a permanent or temporary stay, without passports or visas. They also agreed that talks between immigration officials of the two countries regarding practical arrangements for the implementation of the new policy would take place as soon as possible thereafter.

The negotiation of the details of the Arrangement (or Open Door Policy as it was then called) was announced on 4 February 1973 by the Australian Minister for Immigration, Mr. A. J. Grassby. Two special emissaries of the Australian government (Mr. G. E. Hitchins and Mr. T. A. Smith of the Department of Immigration) visited New Zealand from 5–9 February 1973 to arrange the details of the implementation of the open door policy agreed upon by Prime Ministers Whitlam and Kirk.

The TTTA itself was then implemented on 1 March 1973. Two weeks later on 15 March 1973, the New Zealand Minister for Immigration, Mr. F. M. Colman, and Mr. A. J. Grassby reviewed the revised travel requirements in Canberra and issued a joint press release on the exercise. For the press release the Ministers recalled that under the relaxed procedures passports and prior authority to enter were not required for direct travel between Australia and New Zealand by:

- (1) Citizens of Australia or New Zealand;
- (2) Citizens of other Commonwealth countries who have been granted permission to reside indefinitely in either Australia or New Zealand;

It was also announced that in addition to the relaxed requirements for crossing the Tasman Sea all holders of New Zealand passports would in future be permitted to travel to Australia without prior authority. All Australian passport holders travelling to New Zealand from any part of the world had been able to enter New Zealand without prior authority for the past two years.

=== Changes in the 1980s ===
On 24 April 1981, Australian Minister for Immigration Ian Macphee announced that all people entering Australia (including New Zealand citizens) would be required to carry a passport as from 1 July 1981. This measure was intended to curb abuses of the existing Trans-Tasman Travel Arrangement. The Australian Royal Commission of Inquiry into Drugs and Australian police, security and immigration authorities had drawn attention to the ease with which the existing arrangement at the time could be exploited. People involved in terrorism, drug trafficking or other illegal activities, could too easily pass themselves off as Australian or New Zealand citizens under the arrangement, representing a significant threat to society. The existing arrangement had also been exploited by people who had abducted children from Australia.

The new measures were also aimed at preventing people from other countries circumventing Australia's normal migration requirements by significantly curbing the ability of people to falsely represent themselves as Australian or New Zealand citizens.

"The new measures will preserve a uniquely privileged position for New Zealanders in Australia’s immigration policies in allowing them to enter Australia without visas", the Minister said.

"The passport requirement represents the option involving least delay and inconvenience to travellers among the various approaches which might have been taken to close off this loophole in Australian entry controls", the Minister said.

The Australian government had considered and rejected the alternative of instituting intensive interrogation and baggage search of people crossing the Tasman. It was also announced that arrangements for special lines at major airports exclusively for Australian and New Zealand citizens would be developed, further facilitating the traditional right of Australians and New Zealanders to travel freely between the two countries.

By 1981, when these new changes to the TTTA were announced the number of New Zealanders living in Australia had approximately doubled to around 177,000 from 80,000 in 1971.

In 1987, New Zealand introduced a new Immigration Act. The 1987 Act and regulations under it exempted Australian citizens and permanent residents from the requirements to hold a visa and/or residence permit to enter and stay in New Zealand in order to continue with the free movement regime of the TTTA. The exemptions were put into effect by regulations made under the Act, not the 1987 Act itself. It gives Australian citizens an indefinite stay in New Zealand, without restriction on work, study or re-entry under immigration legislation. The holders of Australian permanent resident visas were granted New Zealand residence permits on arrival and to re-enter New Zealand, this group must have continued to hold a valid Australian permanent resident visa or obtain a New Zealand Returning Resident Visa.

As a result of higher wages and the greater economic market in Australia, the vast majority of trans-Tasman migration is from New Zealand to Australia.

== Visa requirements ==
Prior to 1 September 1994, Australia generally treated New Zealanders as exempt non-citizens. Since 1 September 1994 Australia has had a universal visa requirement. To specifically cater for the continued free movement of New Zealanders to Australia, the Special Category Visa was also introduced on 1 September 1994 by the Migration Regulations 1994. It is known as a subclass 444 visa. Under the 1994 regulations New Zealand citizens entering Australia are treated as having applied for a temporary entry visa, which is automatically granted (subject to health and character considerations) and recorded electronically. Unlike other nationals, there is no requirement to obtain a visa prior to arrival. And unlike other temporary visas, this particular visa – known as Special Category Visa (SCV) subclass 444 – has no time limit for New Zealand citizens. A date stamp in their passport on arrival is all that New Zealand citizens would observe on entry to Australia. For ePassport holders who use SmartGate, there is no date stamp.

In 2009 New Zealand introduced a new Immigration Act, which provided for a universal visa system similar to Australia's. The 2009 Act also reflected Australia's Special Category Visa system in that it provided for Australians to be automatically granted an electronic visa on arrival to New Zealand to facilitate entry without any additional administrative requirements such as completing visa application forms.

The 2009 Act entitled someone to reside in New Zealand indefinitely if the person holds one of the following residence class visas:

- a resident visa with entry permission issued under the Immigration Act 2009 or
- a permanent resident visa issued under the Immigration Act 2009 or
- a resident permit issued under the Immigration Act 1987 (these were issued before 29 November 2010).

Australian citizens and Australian permanent residents are considered to be holding a residence class visa for the purposes of the Act and based on regulations made under the Act.

The 2009 Act and regulations re-confirmed the previous conditions necessary in order for Australian citizens and permanent residents to be allowed to live, work and study in New Zealand under the TTTA. Australian citizens would need to be of good character (a character declaration is made by completing the character section of the New Zealand Passenger Arrival Card) and need to show a valid Australian passport on arrival in New Zealand (or if holding a foreign passport, this passport must show an Australian Citizen Endorsement or Australian Citizen Declaratory Visa (either with a label or a confirmation letter) as evidence of the holder's Australian citizenship). Australian permanent residents also need to show they are of good character, but do not need a physical label in their passports as in most cases Immigration New Zealand will recognise Australian permanent resident visas issued electronically.

After arrival in New Zealand under the TTTA, Australian citizens and permanent residents may qualify for a Permanent Resident Visa (PRV) provided they have held a Resident Visa continuously for more than 24 months, and have met the PRV criteria. However, Resident Visas held by Australians expire upon exit from New Zealand, so travelling in and out of New Zealand can affect the requirement that the Resident Visa must be held for two years continuously. If an Australian citizen or permanent resident is in New Zealand on a Resident visa and wishes to stay long term and apply for a permanent resident visa in the future, they should make an application for a Variation of Travel Conditions (VOTC) if they wish to travel in the meantime to ensure that the resident visa does not expire when leaving New Zealand.

== Citizenship ==
Prior to 2001, Australian citizenship law treated New Zealand citizens residing in Australia as effectively Australian permanent residents, making them eligible to apply for citizenship on the same terms as other permanent residents. The 2001 reforms removed that status – New Zealanders who arrived in Australia after 26 February 2001 would not be eligible to apply for Australian citizenship, no matter how many years they had been resident, unless they first made an expensive application for permanent residency. This change was unpopular in New Zealand and became an irritant in the diplomatic relationship between the two countries. In response, in 2023, the Australian government agreed with New Zealand to amend Australia's citizenship laws to enable New Zealanders resident in Australia to directly apply for Australian citizenship after four years residence, without needing to apply for permanent residency first.

== Entitlement to benefits ==
Originally, New Zealand citizens arriving in Australia were entitled to unemployment benefits immediately on arrival in Australia. Similarly, Australian citizens were entitled to social security benefits in New Zealand. During the 1980s and 1990s, this became a hotly debated political issue. Starting in 1986, New Zealand citizens were required to be resident in Australia for six months before receiving benefits, and in 2000, New Zealand citizens were required to reside in Australia for two years before they could receive payments. This is also the case for Australian citizens residing in New Zealand. However, this was subsequently restricted further.

In 2001, Australian legislation classified New Zealanders living in Australia into two categories: those who were resident in Australia on 26 February 2001 (Protected Special Category Visas), and those who arrived in Australia after that date (Special Category Visa).

Those who were resident before or on 26 February 2001 may claim unemployment benefits as they are protected Special Category Visa holders under the Social Security Act. New Zealanders who arrive in Australia after 26 February 2001 must apply for and be granted a formal Australian permanent visa to obtain certain social security benefits not covered by the bilateral Social Security Agreement, despite being able to live indefinitely in Australia.

They may qualify for benefits after applying to the Department of Immigration and Citizenship for a permanent visa and serving the two-year newly arrived resident waiting period.

While this still allowed the freedom to live and work indefinitely in Australia, it restricted access to certain privileges of holding a formal Australian permanent visa, such as access to certain social security payments and the ability to apply for naturalisation as an Australian citizen after a sufficient period of residence.

== Employment of New Zealanders in Australia ==
In a 2013 article entitled "Tougher policy needed for New Zealanders wanting to work in Australia", Bob Birrell, an academic at Monash University, wrote that:

"During the 1990s, the Australian government sought to better target its migration program to skills needed in Australia. The resulting tight arrangements contrasted with the freedom of New Zealand citizens, regardless of age or skills, to move to Australia. Also, by this time about a third of the New Zealand citizens arriving in Australia were from third world countries who had gained New Zealand citizenship after the required three years of residence (now five years). As the New Zealand migration rules were less strict than those applying in Australia it was thought that this was a form of "back door" entry.

The changes to the Trans-Tasman rules in 2001 reflected these concerns. The Australian government’s expectation was that the new rules would deter movement on the part of New Zealand citizens who could not meet the requirements for permanent skilled migration.

Few New Zealand citizens arriving since 2001 have accessed this permanent residence pathway. The changes have also not deterred New Zealand citizens (including those from third world countries) from moving to Australia. Their numbers continue to increase. New Zealand citizens are adding about a net 27,000 to the number of Australian residents each year – more than any other country.

The reason is that the gap in GDP per capita in Australia and New Zealand is growing and is currently over 20%. New Zealanders will keep on coming while this gap persists.

Successive Australian governments have continued to better target the migration program to skills needed in Australia. The emphasis now is on employer sponsorship – on the grounds the employers are the best judge of the skills needed. The unregulated New Zealand flow is leaving a gaping hole in these efforts."

The Australian Dental Association has expressed in 2014 about the dental occupation that:

"There is substantial oversupply in metropolitan areas as indicated by the number of applications received for each advertised position in both the public and private sector, the proportion of full-time to part-time work available and the number of dentists who report difficulty in obtaining full-time work."

...

"Overseas qualified dentists who have met registration requirements in New Zealand receive automatic recognition in Australia .... Achieving registration in New Zealand is seen by many as a means of 'back door' entry into Australia"

== Removal on character grounds ==
In 2014, the Australian Government amended the Migration Act to allow the cancellation of Australian visas for non-citizens on character grounds, including having been sentenced to prison for more than twelve months. The stricter character requirements also target non-citizens who have lived in Australia for most of their lives. By July 2018, about 1,300 New Zealanders had been deported from Australia on character grounds. While Australian officials have defended the tougher deportation measures, their New Zealand counterparts have warned that these would damage the historical "bonds of mateship" between the two countries. See more at New Zealand Australians § 2014 character test and subsequent developments.

Under Sections 15 and 16 of New Zealand's 2009 Immigration Act, any person (including Australian citizens and permanent residents) may be denied resident visas and entry into the country if they:

- have been convicted and sentenced to five or more years of imprisonment, even if the conviction was later expunged
- have been convicted and sentenced to one or more years of imprisonment within the past ten years
- have been prohibited entry by sections 179 or 180 of the Immigration Act or by any other enactment
- have been removed or deported from any country
- are a member of a group designated as a terrorist entity under the Terrorism Suppression Act 2002
- are deemed by the Minister of Immigration to be likely to commit an imprisonable offence
- are deemed by the Minister of Immigration to be a threat or risk to security, public order, or the public interest

== See also ==
- Central America-4 Border Control Agreement
- Nordic Passport Union
- Schengen Agreement
- Schengen Area
- Visa policy in the European Union
- Common Travel Area an arrangement between the United Kingdom, Crown Dependencies and Ireland, similar to the Trans-Tasman Travel Arrangement
- Union State, an arrangement between Belarus and Russia, similar to the Trans-Tasman Travel Arrangement
- 1950 Indo-Nepal Treaty of Peace and Friendship
- CANZUK, a proposal for free movement between Canada, Australia, New Zealand and the United Kingdom using the Trans-Tasman Travel Arrangement as a model
