= Special Category Visa =

Australian visa category

A Special Category Visa (SCV) is an Australian visa category (subclass 444) granted to most New Zealand citizens on arrival in Australia, enabling them to visit, study, stay and work in Australia indefinitely under the Trans-Tasman Travel Arrangement. Currently, there are two categories of SCVs: protected SCV and as non-protected SCV. New Zealanders who had entered Australia before 26 February 2001 are classified as protected SCV holders, and after that date as non-protected SCV holders. The rights of the two categories are somewhat different.

== Description ==
A Special Category Visa is granted to New Zealander passport holders upon arrival to Australia. The SCV remains valid until the visa holder acquires Australian permanent residency or citizenship or has their visa cancelled. The SCV ceases when its holder departs Australia for any reason, but a new SCV is granted on return.

The SCV allows New Zealand citizens to reside in Australia; visit, work and study in Australia; and apply for permanent visas if they meet eligibility requirements. The SCV is technically classified as a temporary visa, despite its holder's residence in Australia not being subject to any limitation as to time imposed by law.

Most New Zealanders are eligible for a SCV, except:

- those with tuberculosis
- those with significant criminal records, i.e. being sentenced to more than 12 months' imprisonment combined in total
- those who hold temporary or permanent Australian visas
- those who arrive in Australia using another passport (e.g. if holding dual nationality). In this case an SCV can be obtained at a Department of Immigration office in Australia upon production of a valid New Zealand passport
- those who arrive for specified purposes, such as diplomats and visiting forces, who are normally granted a special purpose visa

== History ==
The Special Category Visa was created on 1 September 1994 by the Migration Regulations 1994, which created the universal visa system in Australia. Prior to that date, New Zealanders were generally treated as exempt non-citizens in Australia, not requiring a visa for entry. Under the 1994 regulations, New Zealanders entering Australia are treated as having applied for a temporary entry visa, which is automatically granted, subject to health and character considerations, on arrival.

=== Protected SCV ===
Until 26 February 2001, SCV holders were generally treated the same as permanent visa holders.

After that date, they are considered protected SCV holders and retain the same rights as permanent residents if they meet one of the following conditions:

1. In Australia with SCV on 26 February 2001
2. Was in Australia with SCV for a total of at least a year during the two years prior to that date
3. Usually in Australia with SCV, away temporarily on 26 Feb 2001, collected an Australian social benefit on that date, and returned before 26 August 2001

They are eligible for most social security benefits without restriction. They are also eligible to apply for Australian citizenship, provided they meet character and health requirements, without needing to apply for permanent residency.

=== Non-protected SCV ===
In 2001, Australia introduced a number of changes in the rights of SCV holders. New Zealanders who enter Australia after 26 February 2001, remain in Australia to live and work indefinitely are classed as non-protected SCV holders. They have restricted access to social security benefits; e.g. they are eligible for a one-off 6-month unemployment benefit after 10 years of residence under the current rules. They are also required to apply for and obtain Australian permanent resident status before becoming eligible for Australian citizenship.

During the COVID-19 pandemic in Australia, many SCV holders were ineligible to access Centrelink payments, prompting many to return to New Zealand. On 30 March 2020, Australian Prime Minister Scott Morrison announced that Special Category Visa holders would be eligible for AU$1,500 fortnightly payments as hardship assistance following negotiations with New Zealand Prime Minister Jacinda Ardern.

In early July 2022, Australian Prime Minister Anthony Albanese confirmed that SCV holders would be eligible for flood relief assistance following the 2022 New South Wales floods. This flood relief assistance consists of a one-off means-tested payment of A$1,000 for adults and A$400 for children. Ardern welcomed this development as a positive step in Australian-New Zealand bilateral relations.

== Permanent resident status ==
SCV holders are “permanent residents” in the common sense; they are legally entitled to live and work in Australia indefinitely. However, their legislative position is unclear insofar as there is no standardized legal definition of permanent resident status; immigration and nationality legislation treats SCV holders inconsistently.

Section 204 of the Migration Act 1958 includes all SCV holders within the definition of 'permanent resident' on the basis they are 'not subject to any limitation as to time imposed by law'.

The Migration Regulations 1994 exclude all SCV holders from the definition of 'Australian permanent resident', including only permanent visa holders within the definition.

The Australian Citizenship Act 2007 empowers a Minister to define the status of SCV holders for the purposes of the Act. The current legislative instrument includes some SCV holders, while excluding others.

=== Resident Return Visa ===
New Zealand citizens who entered Australia before 1 September 1994 (regardless of the purpose of entry) are considered "former Australian permanent residents", and eligible to apply for a Resident Return Visa (RRV). An RRV can be issued to former Australian permanent residents who wish to restore their permanent residence status. Applicants must demonstrate 'substantial ties of benefit to Australia' and give compelling reasons for any continuous absences of 5 years or more (since their last stay in Australia as a permanent resident, i.e. as a New Zealand citizen entering before 1 September 1994). In the absence of a RRV, a new SCV will be granted (notably, if the previously-held SCV was issued before 26 February 2001, their status will be downgraded from protected to non-protected).

=== Subclass 189 program ===
Since 1 July 2017, SCV holders who were resident in Australia on or before 19 February 2016 could apply for permanent residence after 5 years in Australia, in a new New Zealand stream within the Skilled Independent (subclass 189) visa. They must:

- be resident in Australia for a continuous period of five years prior to application
- submit income tax returns which show assessable income at least equivalent to the Temporary Skilled Migration Income Threshold (TSMIT) (i.e. AU$53,900 per annum) for each income year within the five-year period (i.e. the most recent four income years) prior to application, unless they were claiming an income exemption.
- pass mandatory health, character and security checks.

On 1 July 2021, the income criteria was relaxed to three income years in the five-year period, one of which must be the most recent income year. This only applied to new applications from that date and did not apply to existing submitted applications.

The stream was temporarily paused to new applications between 10 December 2022 and 1 July 2023 to allow existing applications to be processed. The criteria relating to the period of residence in Australia, the income threshold and health were also removed. The streamlining of processes was an acknowledgement that the existing applicants were long-term residents of Australia who have worked and contributed to Australia's economy. The federal government has indicated that they would be considering future options for New Zealand citizens in Australia.

Until 31 December 2022, New Zealand citizens who were granted the subclass 189 NZ visa were eligible to apply for Australian citizenship after 12 months, in addition to the 5 years as a SCV holder. Since 1 January 2023, New Zealand citizens who have been granted the subclass 189 NZ visa can immediately apply for Australian citizenship without the need to hold permanent residency for 12 months. This also applies to those who were granted the visa prior to this date.

On 22 April 2023, Australian Prime Minister Anthony Albanese, Home Affairs Minister Clare O'Neil, and Immigration Minister Andrew Giles announced Special Category Visa holders who have resided in Australia for four years and meet other residency requirements would be able to directly apply for Australian citizenship from 1 July 2023 without the need to apply for permanent residency. In addition, children born in Australia to a New Zealander from 1 July 2023 will automatically be eligible for Australian citizenship. The announcement was welcomed by New Zealand Prime Minister Chris Hipkins and Oz Kiwi chairperson Joanne Cox for improving New Zealanders' access to Australian citizenship and social security.

== Cancellation of SCVs ==
In December 2014, the Australian Government amended the Migration Act 1958 to introduce "Section 501" which facilitated the deportation of non-citizens who had been imprisoned for twelve months and were deemed by Australian authorities to be of "bad character." By July 2019, nearly 1,600 New Zealanders (including SCV holders) who had received a prison sentence of 1 year or more had their visas cancelled and were deported. That same year, the Australian Government indicated it was planning to tighten the Section 501 "character test" by considering the maximum sentence for an offence, rather than the sentence applied.

The accelerated deportation of New Zealanders (many of whom had spent most of their lives in Australia) under the 501 character test has strained bilateral relations between Wellington and Canberra. While Australian policymakers including Home Affairs Minister Peter Dutton and Prime Minister Scott Morrison defended the deportations on law and order grounds, New Zealand policymakers including Justice Minister Andrew Little and Prime Minister Jacinda Ardern have criticised the deportations for violating human rights and damaging bilateral relations. By March 2022, 2,544 New Zealanders had been deported from Australia, which accounted for 96% of deportations to New Zealand since 2015. Due to limited family connections, poverty, and poor employment opportunities, many former deportees relapsed into criminal offender. Between January 2015 and March 2022, former deportees accounted for 8,000 offenses including dishonesty, violent crime, drugs, and anti-social behaviour. In addition, the 501 deportation policy also contributed to a surge in organised crime in New Zealand due to the repatriation of Comanchero and Mongol bikie gang members.

== See also ==
- Trans-Tasman Travel Arrangement
- Australian nationality law
- New Zealand nationality law
- Permanent Resident of Norfolk Island visa
- Temporary protection visa
