= Australian permanent resident =

Immigration status category

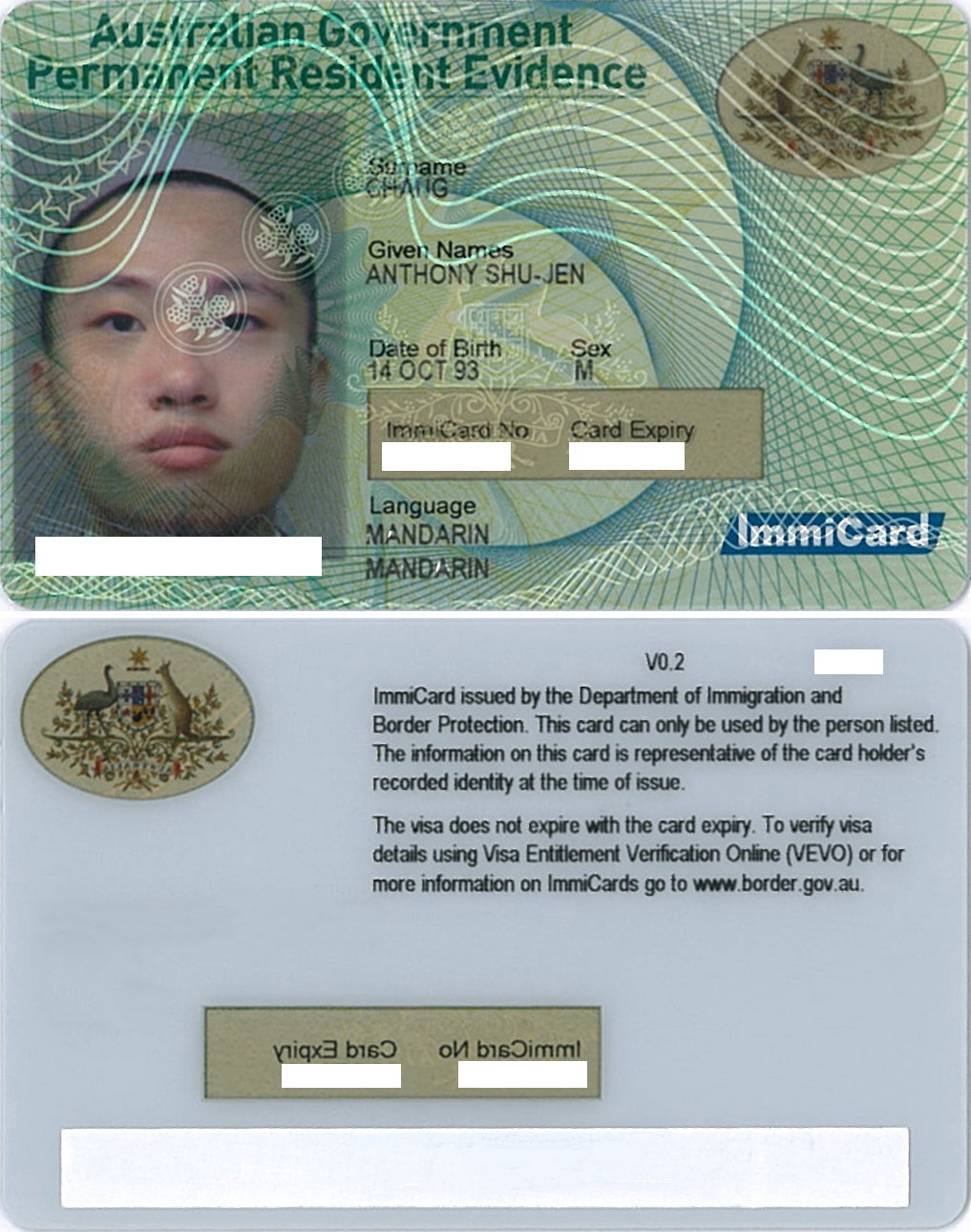
Australian Permanent Resident ImmiCard

Australian permanent residents are residents of Australia who hold a permanent visa but are not citizens of Australia. A holder of a permanent visa may remain in Australia indefinitely. A 5-year initial travel facility, which corresponds to the underlying migration program, is granted alongside the permanent visa. Until the travel facility expires, the visa holder may leave and re-enter Australia freely. After that period the visa holder needs to re-apply for the travel facility. However, holders of a permanent visa who are already in Australia with an expired travel facility may remain in Australia indefinitely.

Permanent residents enjoy many of the rights and privileges of citizens, including access to free or subsidised legal, education and health services. They do not have the right to vote in federal or state/territory elections, unless they were registered to vote prior to 1984, but may vote in some local government elections. Permanent residents are not entitled to an Australian passport.

Most permanent residents are eligible to become citizens after a waiting period. When the waiting period is complete, the process of sitting the citizenship test and attending the ceremony may add up to two years to gaining citizenship.

== Migration programs ==
There are a number of programs under which a person may enter and obtain permanent residency in Australia, including:

- Skilled stream - mainly for skilled migrants, and has made available 129,250 visas for year 2012-2013
- Family and Child stream Family members can also be sponsored. An unlimited number of visas can be issued for partners (either married or de facto) and dependent children. Visas for other family member types are subject to limited (known as "capping"); for example there are only 1000 visas available under the 'Parent' category, and as a consequence there is currently up to a twenty-year waiting period before undergoing consideration for these visas.
- Special Eligibility - mainly for former residents and persons who served in the Australian Defence Force.
- Humanitarian Program - mainly for refugees seeking permanent residency, and has made available 13,750 visas for year 2012-2013.

== Citizens of New Zealand ==
Citizens of New Zealand are allowed to enter Australia to live and work indefinitely under the Trans-Tasman Travel Arrangement, without applying for a visa but instead are automatically granted a Special Category Visa (SCV) on arrival. Though able to reside with no time limit, SCV holders are not considered as having permanent resident status, and the SCV is a temporary visa. Between 2001 and 2023, SCV holders who wanted to become Australian citizens first needed to apply for and obtain a permanent visa under one of the migration programs. On 1 July 2023, new legislation was introduced to consider SCV holders permanent residents for the purposes of Australian citizenship, allowing them to apply directly for citizenship.

== Benefits and limitations ==
Benefits of permanent resident status include:

- Few limitations on employment in Australia. Some job opportunities, largely federal governmental work, require citizenship as opposed to permanent residence.
- The right to apply for Australian citizenship after fulfilling some criteria.
- For permanent residents accepted under the humanitarian program and enrolled in a Commonwealth supported place, the right to defer payment of their student contribution under the HECS-HELP scheme.
- The right to sponsor relatives for permanent residence, subject to fulfilling residence criteria and assurance of support requirements.
- Children born inside Australia will be Australian citizens by birth.
- The right to access medical and social security benefits, though there is a 2-year waiting period for some benefits.
- The right to travel to New Zealand without applying for a New Zealand visa. (This right is granted by the New Zealand government.)
- Unrestricted rights to live, work and study in New Zealand. (This right is granted by the New Zealand government.)

Permanent residents do not have the right to vote in federal, state or territory elections, unless they were “British subjects” and registered to vote prior to 1984, but may vote in some local government elections. Permanent residents are not entitled to an Australian passport.

== See also ==
- Australian nationality law
