= Immigration to New Zealand =

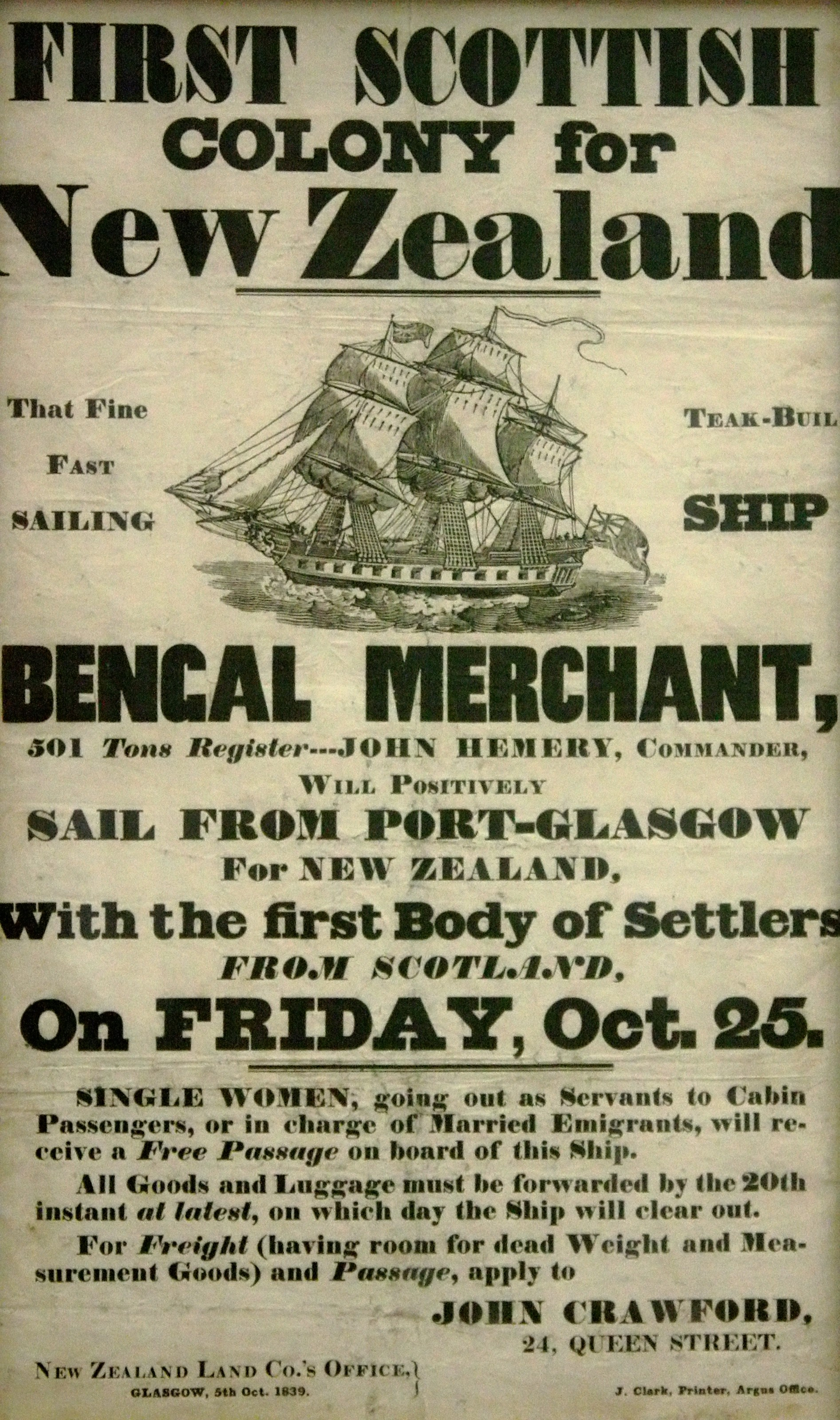
"First Scottish Colony for New Zealand" – 1839 poster advertising emigration from Scotland to New Zealand. Collection of Kelvingrove Art Gallery and Museum, Glasgow, Scotland.

Migration to New Zealand began only very recently in human history, with Polynesian settlement in New Zealand, previously uninhabited, about 1250 CE to 1280 CE. European migration provided a major influx, especially following the signing of the Treaty of Waitangi in 1840. Subsequent immigrants have come chiefly from the British Isles, but also from continental Europe, the Pacific, the Americas and Asia.

== Polynesian settlement ==
Polynesians in the South Pacific were the first to discover the landmass of New Zealand. Eastern Polynesian explorers had settled in New Zealand by approximately the thirteenth century CE with most evidence pointing to an arrival date of about 1280. Their arrival gave rise to the Māori culture and the Māori language, both unique to New Zealand, although very closely related to analogues in other parts of Eastern Polynesia. Evidence from Wairau Bar and the Chatham Islands shows that the Polynesian colonists maintained many parts of their east Polynesian culture such as burial customs for at least 50 years. Especially strong resemblances link Māori to the languages and cultures of the Cook and Society Islands, which are regarded as the most likely places of origin. Moriori settled the Chatham Islands during the 15th century from mainland New Zealand. Contrary to Percy Smith's Great Fleet narrative, the Moriori were not an earlier Melanesian wave of immigrants who pre-dated the Māori people but were descended from the same Polynesian ancestors of the Māori.

== European settlement ==
Due to New Zealand's geographic isolation, several centuries passed before the next phase of settlement by the Europeans. It was only with the arrival of these new settlers that the original inhabitants began to distinguish themselves using the adjective māori, meaning "ordinary" or "indigenous." Although the term New Zealand native was common until about 1890, māori gradually shifted in use from being an adjective to a noun. According to the historian Rawiri Taonui, Māori also adopted the term Tangata Whenua ("people of the land"), referring to their iwi (tribes) and hapu (sub-groups), in order to distringuish themselves from non-Māori.

The first European explorers to circumnavigate New Zealand were Abel Tasman (1642–1643), James Cook (1769, 1773–1774), Jean-François de Surville (1769) and Marc-Joseph Marion du Fresne (1772). The establishment of British colonies in Australia from 1788 and the boom in whaling and sealing in the Southern Ocean brought many Europeans to the vicinity of New Zealand, with some settling. Whalers and sealers were often itinerant and the first real settlers were missionaries and traders in the Bay of Islands area from 1809. By 1830 there was a population of about 800 non-Māori, which included about 200 runaway convicts and seamen who often married into the Māori community. The seamen often lived in New Zealand for a short time before joining another ship a few months later. In 1839 there were 2,000 non-Māori, with the majority living in the North Island. Regular outbreaks of extreme violence, mainly between Māori hapu, known as the Musket Wars, resulted in the deaths of at least 20,000 Māori between 1819 and 1843. Violence against European shipping, cannibalism and the lack of established law and order made settling in New Zealand a risky prospect. By the late 1830s many Māori were nominally Christian and had freed many of the Māori slaves that had been captured during the Musket Wars. By this time, many Māori, especially in the north, could read and write Māori and, to a lesser extent, English.

== Migration from 1840 ==
A poster of the Shaw Savill Line promoting immigration to New Zealand in the 1870s, featuring the flag of the United Tribes of New Zealand

European migration has resulted in a deep legacy being left on the social and political structures of New Zealand. Early visitors to New Zealand included whalers, sealers, missionaries, mariners, and merchants, attracted to natural resources in abundance.

New Zealand was temporarily administered from New South Wales from January 1840 until it became a separate Crown colony on 3 May 1841, with William Hobson serving its first governor. Some of the first permanent settlers were Australians. Some were escaped convicts, and others were ex-convicts that had completed their sentences. Smaller numbers came directly from Great Britain, Ireland, Germany (forming the next biggest immigrant group after the British and Irish), France, Portugal, the Netherlands, Denmark, The United States, and Canada.

In February 1840 representatives of the British Crown signed the Treaty of Waitangi with 240 Māori chiefs throughout New Zealand, motivated by plans for a French colony at Akaroa and land purchases by the New Zealand Company in 1839. British sovereignty was then proclaimed over New Zealand in May 1840. By May 1841, New Zealand had become a Crown colony. Since the signing of the Treaty of Waitangi, differences between the English and Māori versions of the text have fuelled debate in New Zealand society and politics over whether Māori tribes ceded sovereignty to the Crown. This has complicated Māori-Crown relations. During the 19th and 20th centuries, Māori lost much of their land to government confiscations during the New Zealand Wars and for public works purchases. Following the Second World War, Māori calls for the Government to honour the Treaty led to the establishment of the Waitangi Tribunal in 1975 to consider Treaty breaches and facilitate compensation to Māori for confiscated land and resources.

Following the formalising of sovereignty, organised and structured flow of migrants from Great Britain and Ireland began. Government-chartered ships like the clipper Gananoque and the Glentanner carried immigrants to New Zealand. Typically clipper ships left British ports such as London and travelled south through the central Atlantic to about 43 degrees south to pick up the strong westerly winds that carried the clippers well south of South Africa and Australia. Ships would then head north once in the vicinity of New Zealand. The Glentanner migrant ship of 610 tonnes made two runs to New Zealand and several to Australia carrying 400 tonne of passengers and cargo. Travel time was about 3 to 3 1/2 months to New Zealand. Cargo carried on the Glentanner for New Zealand included coal, slate, lead sheet, wine, beer, cart components, salt, soap and passengers' personal goods. On the 1857 passage the ship carried 163 official passengers, most of them government assisted. On the return trip the ship carried a wool cargo worth 45,000 pounds. In the 1860s discovery of gold started a gold rush in Otago. By 1860 more than 100,000 British and Irish settlers lived throughout New Zealand. The Otago Association actively recruited settlers from Scotland, creating a definite Scottish influence in that region, while the Canterbury Association recruited settlers from the south of England, creating a definite English influence over that region.

In the 1860s most migrants settled in the South Island due to gold discoveries and the availability of flat grass covered land for pastoral farming. Following the end of the New Zealand Wars, the New Zealand Government sought to attract more European immigrants to the North Island via the Waikato Immigration Scheme which ran from 1864 and 1865. The central government originally intended to bring about 20,000 immigrants to the Waikato from the British Isles and the Cape Colony in South Africa to consolidate the government position after the wars and develop the Waikato area for European settlement. The immigration scheme settlers were allocated quarter-acre town sections and ten-acre rural sections. They were required to work on and improve the sections for two years after which a Crown Grant would be issued, giving them ownership. In all, 13 ships travelled to New Zealand under the scheme, arriving from London, Glasgow and Cape Town.

In the 1870s, Premier Julius Vogel borrowed millions of pounds from Britain to help fund capital development such as a nationwide rail system, lighthouses, ports and bridges, and encouraged mass migration from Britain. Between 1864 and 1874, the non-Māori population in New Zealand (including Europeans and Chinese New Zealanders) rose from 171,000 to 255,000. By 1881, the non-Māori population had reached over 470,000. Due to exposure to diseases which they lacked natural immunity to and the New Zealand Wars, the Māori population dopped from 56,049 in 1857–1858 to 42,113 in 1896.

Other smaller groups of settlers came from Germany, Scandinavia, and other parts of Europe as well as from China and India, but English, Scottish and Irish settlers made up the vast majority, and did so for the next 150 years. Today, the majority of New Zealanders have some sort of English, Scottish, Welsh and Irish ancestry. This comes with last names (mainly English, Irish, and Scottish) as well.

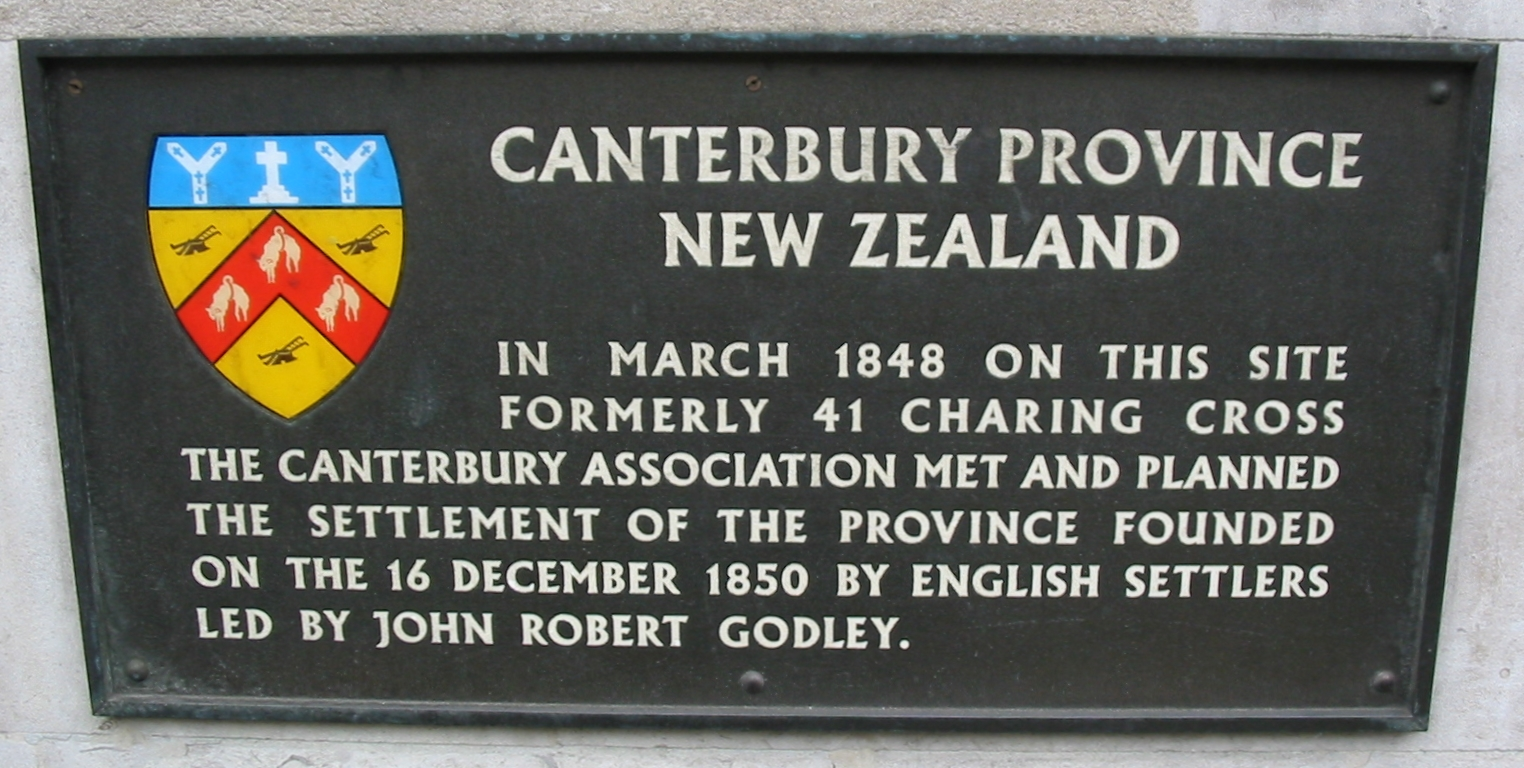
Plaque in Whitehall in London, commemorating the first meeting of the Canterbury Association at 41 Charing Cross Road. The association would go on to found Canterbury, New Zealand, in 1850.

Between 1881 and the 1920s, the New Zealand Parliament passed legislation that intended to limit Asiatic migration to New Zealand, and prevented Asians from naturalising. In particular, the New Zealand government levied a poll tax on Chinese immigrants up until the 1930s. New Zealand finally abolished the poll tax in 1944, though it was not applied after 1934.

Large numbers of Dalmatians fled from the Austro-Hungarian empire to settle in New Zealand in the late 19th and early 20th centuries. They settled mainly in West Auckland and often worked to establish vineyards and orchards or worked on gum fields in the Northland Region.

In the 1930s, 1,100 Jewish refugees from Central Europe came to New Zealand, fleeing antisemitism in Nazi Germany, Austria, Czechoslovakia, Poland and Hungary.

Many children of Polish descent arrived as orphans via Siberia and Iran during World War II.

== Post World War II migration ==
With the various agencies of the United Nations dealing with humanitarian efforts following World War II, New Zealand accepted about 5,000 refugees and displaced persons from Europe, and more than 1,100 Hungarians between 1956 and 1959 (see Refugees in New Zealand). The post-WWII immigration included more people from Greece, Italy, Poland and the former Yugoslavia.

New Zealand limited immigration to those who would meet a labour shortage in New Zealand. To encourage those to come, the government introduced free and assisted passages in 1947, a scheme expanded by the National Party administration in 1950. However, when it became clear that not enough skilled migrants would come from the British Isles alone, recruitment began in Northern European countries. New Zealand signed a bilateral agreement for skilled migrants with the Netherlands, and tens of thousands of Dutch immigrants arrived in New Zealand. Others came in the 1950s from Denmark, Germany, Switzerland and Austria to meet needs in specialised occupations.

While New Zealand did not have implicitly racist immigration legislation after the abolition of the Head Tax in 1944, the Immigration Act 1919 permitted the Minister of Immigration to arbitrarily reject immigration applications where he or she saw fit. Given the prevailing social attitudes at the time, the practical effect of the legislation was to allow the Minister to pursue an immigration policy which gave preference to persons regarded as being of adequate racial characteristics – namely, those of European ancestry. A Department of External Affairs memorandum in 1953 would state: "Our immigration is based firmly on the principle that we are and intend to remain a country of European development. It is inevitably discriminatory against Asians—indeed against all persons who are not wholly of European race and colour. Whereas we have done much to encourage immigration from Europe, we do everything to discourage it from Asia."

In 1961, the New Zealand Parliament passed the Immigration Amendment Act 1961 which placed non-British and non-Irish immigrants on an equal footing with other non-New Zealand citizens (except for Australia) by requiring them to have a permit before entering the country. In practice, British and Irish nationals were issued with a permit on arrival; a privileged not extended to other migrants. In 1974, the New Zealand Government amended immigration policy by requiring British and Irish migrants to obtain a permit before leaving their homeland, placing them on an equal footing with other nationalities. That same year, the New Zealand Government eased the English language requirement for migrants.

By 1967, the policy of excluding people based on nationality had shifted to take account of economic needs. The economic boom of the 1960s caused a demand for unskilled labour, particularly Pacific Island workers. As such, New Zealand encouraged migrants from the South Pacific to fill labour shortages, which were pronounced in the manufacturing sector. The change in immigration policy saw Pasifika in New Zealand grow to 45,413 by 1971, with Auckland being home to the largest Polynesian population in the world.

A record number of immigrants then arrived between 1971 and 1975, with net immigration exceeding 100,000 for the first time. While the overwhelming majority of migrants were from the United Kingdom and Australia, some 26,000 Pacific Islanders settled in New Zealand between 1972 and 1978, compared with 70,000 Britons and 35,000 Australians. By 1978, this trend had reversed. The decline of the New Zealand economy, marked by high inflation and rising unemployment, caused a net loss of population between 1976 and 1980, a trend that was only reversed in the 1980s. Issues of crime and housing added to increasing unease about Polynesian immigration, which was a major theme in the 1975 election campaign.

== Skills-based immigration, 1980s–present ==
=== Increased multiculturalism ===
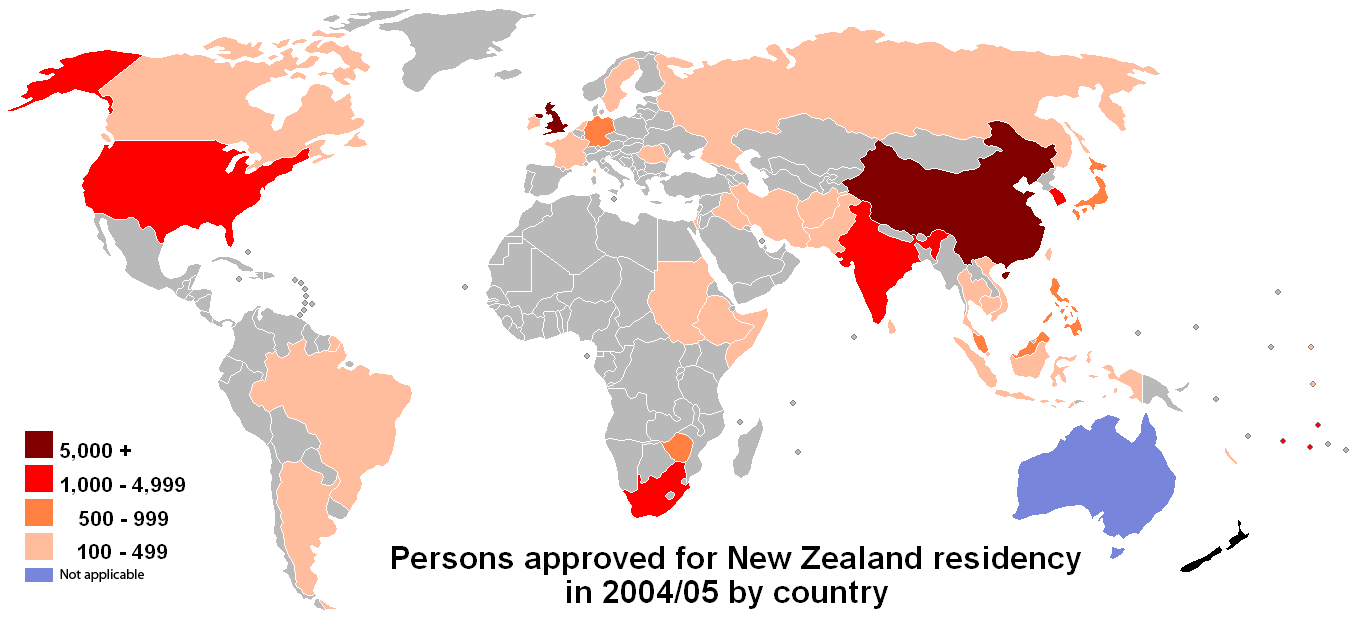
Acquisition of New Zealand residency by citizenship, 2004/05 (fy). Source: New Zealand Department of Labour

Along with New Zealand adopting a radically new direction of economic practice, Parliament passed the Immigration Act 1987 into law. This would end the preference for migrants from Britain, Europe or Northern America based on their race, and instead classify migrants on their skills, personal qualities, and potential contribution to New Zealand economy and society. The introduction of the points-based system came under the Fourth National Government, which pursued immigration reform even more vigorously than the previous Labour government. This system closely resembled that of Canada and came into effect in 1991. The New Zealand Immigration Service now ranked the priority of immigration applications using this points-based system. In 2009, the new Immigration Act 2009 replaced all existing protocols and procedures in the 1987 act and 1991 amendment to it.

The shift towards a skills-based immigration system resulted in a wide variety of ethnicities in New Zealand, with people from over 120 countries represented. Between 1991 and 1995 the numbers of those given approval grew rapidly: 26,000 in 1992; 35,000 in 1994; 54,811 in 1995. The minimum target for residency approval was set at 25,000. The number approved was almost twice what was targeted. The Labour-led governments of 1999–2008 made no change to the Immigration Act 1987, although some changes were made to the 1991 amendment.

In December 2002, the minimum IELTS level for skilled migrants was raised from 5.5 to 6.5 in 2002, following concerns that immigrants who spoke English as a second language encountered difficulty getting jobs in their chosen fields. Since then, migration from Britain and South Africa has increased, at the expense of immigration from Asia. However, a study-for-residency programme for foreign university students has mitigated this imbalance somewhat.

In 2004–2005 Immigration New Zealand set a target of 45,000, representing 1.5% of the total population. However, the net effect was a population decline, since more left than arrived. 48,815 arrived, and overall the population was 10,000 or 0.25% less than the previous year. Overall though, New Zealand has one of the highest populations of foreign born citizens. In 2005, almost 20% of New Zealanders were born overseas, one of the highest percentages of any country in the world.

=== Subsequent amendments ===
The Department of Labour's sixth annual Migration Trends report showed a 21 per cent rise in work permits issued in the 2005/06-year compared with the previous year. Nearly 100,000 people were issued work permits to work in sectors ranging from IT to horticulture in the 2005/06-year. This compares with around 35,000 work permits issued in 1999–2000. Around 52,000 people were approved for permanent New Zealand residence in 2005/06. Over 60 per cent were approved under the skilled or business categories.

By 2005, New Zealand had accepted 60% of the applicants under the Skilled/Business category that awarded points for qualifications and work experience, or business experience and funds they had available.

Changes to the point system have also given more weight to job offers as compared to educational degrees. Some Aucklanders cynically joke that most taxi drivers in Auckland tend to be highly qualified engineers or doctors who are unable to then find jobs in their fields once in the country.

In May 2008, Massey University economist Dr Greg Clydesdale released to the news media an extract of a report, Growing Pains, Evaluations and the Cost of Human Capital, which claimed that Pacific Islanders were "forming an underclass". The report, written by Dr Clydesdale for the "Academy of World Business, Marketing & Management Development 2008 Conference" in Brazil, and based on data from various government departments, provoked highly controversial debate. Pacific Islands community leaders and academic peer reviewers strongly criticised the report, while a provisional review was lodged by Race Relations Commissioner Joris de Bres.

=== Tightening immigration criteria ===
In March 2012, a draft paper leaked to the New Zealand Labour Party showed that Immigration New Zealand was planning to create a two-tier system which would favour wealthy immigrants over poor ones who spoke little or no English. This means that applications from parents sponsored by their higher income children, or those who bring a guaranteed income or funds, would be processed faster than other applications.

During the 2017 New Zealand general election the New Zealand First party campaigned on cutting net immigration to 10,000 per year. NZ First leader Winston Peters said that unemployed New Zealanders would be trained to take jobs as the number is reduced, and the number of older immigrants will be limited, with more encouraged to settle in the regions. Labour Party leader Jacinda Ardern also advocated a lower rate of immigration, suggesting a drop of around 20,000–30,000. Calling it an "infrastructure issue", she said that "there hasn't been enough planning about population growth, we haven't necessarily targeted our skill shortages properly".

According to Statistics New Zealand estimates, New Zealand's net migration (long-term arrivals minus long-term departures) in the June 2016/17 year was 72,300. That was up from 38,300 in the June 2013/14 year. Of those migrants specifying a region of settlement, 61 percent settled in the Auckland region. New Zealand's net migration for the year ending March 2020 was a record 91,900 people.

In May 2022, Prime Minister Jacinda Ardern announced that the Government would be introducing a new "green list" to attract migrants for "high-skilled" and "hard-to-fill" positions from 4 July 2022. Green list applicants would have streamlined residency pathways. This Green List seeks to address skills shortages in the construction, engineering, healthcare and technology sectors. The exclusion of nurses, teachers, and dairy farm managers from the visa residency "green list" was also criticised by the New Zealand Nurses Organisation, the Secondary Principals' Association, and Federated Farmers. In early August 2022, the Government acknowledged that it had not consulted professional nursing bodies and the district health boards about its nursing "green list" visa scheme. On 8 August, the Ministry of Business, Innovation and Employment admitted that only nine nurses had applied for the Green List visa residency scheme by late July 2022.

In addition, the Government also revised its student visa policy to limit the working rights of international student holders to degree-level students and above and prevent applications from applying for a second post-study work visa in order to gain residency.

In December 2022, the Government added nurses and midwives to the immigration green list, making them eligible for immediate residency in New Zealand. In addition, the Government established a temporary residence immigration pathway for bus and truck drivers. In addition teachers and tradespeople including drain layers and motor mechanics were added to the work to residence immigration pathway. These changes came in response to a national labour shortage across different sectors in the New Zealand economy.

New Zealand achieved a record net migration gain of 135,500 people in the year ended October 2023. Immigrants from India, China and the Philippines were the largest contributors to New Zealand's population growth.

In mid-December 2023, Prime Minister Christopher Luxon stated that New Zealand's 118,000 annual net migration rate was unsustainable and that infrastructure needed to be managed better to support growth. Luxon made these remarks after the Australian Government announced a new migration strategy to address pressure on housing and infrastructure in Australia.

On 8 June 2025, Immigration Minister Erica Stanford announced the multi-entry "Parent Boost" visa, which would allow the parents of migrants to reside in New Zealand for between five and ten years. Visa holders would have to meet certain health, character and financial criteria including having at least one year of health insurance cover.

== Key legislation and policies ==
Contemporary regulations state that immigrants must be of good character.

=== Immigration Advisers Licensing Act 2007 ===
Effective in New Zealand from 4 May 2007, the Immigration Advisers Licensing Act requires anyone providing immigration advice to be licensed. It also established the Immigration Advisers Authority to manage the licensing process, both in New Zealand and offshore.

From 4 May 2009 it became mandatory for immigration advisers practising in New Zealand to be licensed unless they are exempt. The introduction of mandatory licensing for New Zealand-based immigration advisers was designed to protect migrants from unscrupulous operators and provide support for licensed advisers.

The licensing managed by the Immigration Advisers Authority Official website establishes and monitors industry standards and sets requirements for continued professional development. As an independent body, the Authority can prosecute unlicensed immigration advisers. Penalties include up to seven years imprisonment and/or fines up to $NZ100,000 for offenders, as well as the possibility of court-ordered reparation payments. It can refer complaints made against licensed advisers to an Independent Tribunal, i.e. Immigration Advisers Complaints & Disciplinary Tribunal.

The Immigration Advisers Authority does not handle immigration applications or inquiries. These are managed by Immigration New Zealand.

=== Immigration Act 2009 ===
Statements by the government in the mid-2000s emphasised that New Zealand must compete for its share of skilled and talented migrants, and David Cunliffe, the former immigration minister, has argued that New Zealand was "in a global race for talent and we must win our share".

With this in mind, a bill (over 400 pages long) was prepared which was sent to Parliament in April 2007. It follows a review of the immigration act. The bill aims to make the process more efficient, and achieves this by giving more power to immigration officers. Rights of appeal were to be streamlined into a single appeal tribunal. Furthermore, any involvement of the Human Rights Commission in matters of immigration to New Zealand would be removed (Part 11, Clause 350).

The new Immigration Act, which passed into law in 2009 replacing the 1987 act, is aimed at enhancing border security and improving the efficiency of the immigration services. Key aspects of the new Act include the ability to use biometrics, a new refugee and protection system, a single independent appeals tribunal and a universal visa system.

=== Other migrant quotas ===
New Zealand accepts 1000 refugees per year (set to grow to 1500 by 1 July 2020) in co-operation with the UNHCR with a strong focus on the Asia-Pacific region.

As part of the Pacific Access Category, 650 citizens come from Fiji, Tuvalu, Kiribati, and Tonga. 1,100 Samoan citizens come under the Samoan Quota scheme. Once resident, these people can apply to bring other family members to New Zealand under the Family Sponsored stream. Any migrant accepted under these schemes receives permanent residency in New Zealand.

== Issues and controversies ==
=== Public opinion ===
As in some other countries, immigration can become a contentious issue; the topic has provoked debate from time to time in New Zealand.

As early as the 1870s, political opponents fought against Vogel's immigration plans.

The political party New Zealand First (founded in 1993) has frequently criticised immigration on economic, social and cultural grounds. New Zealand First leader Winston Peters has on several occasions characterised the rate of Asian immigration into New Zealand as too high; in 2004, he stated: "We are being dragged into the status of an Asian colony and it is time that New Zealanders were placed first in their own country." On 26 April 2005, he said: "Māori will be disturbed to know that in 17 years' time they will be outnumbered by Asians in New Zealand". Peters' statement was proven narrowly incorrect in time; at the 2023 census, 18 years later, Asians made up 17.3% of the population while Māori made up 17.8% of the population.

In April 2008, then deputy New Zealand First Party leader Peter Brown drew widespread attention after voicing similar views and expressing concern at the increase in New Zealand's ethnic Asian population: "We are going to flood this country with Asian people with no idea what we are going to do with them when they come here." "The matter is serious. If we continue this open door policy there is real danger we will be inundated with people who have no intention of integrating into our society. The greater the number, the greater the risk. They will form their own mini-societies to the detriment of integration and that will lead to division, friction and resentment."

=== Overstayers and deportations ===
Between 1974 and 1979, dawn raids were carried out by the New Zealand Police to remove overstayers. These raids controversially targeted Pasifika peoples; many of whom had migrated to the New Zealand during the 1950s and 1960s due to a demand for labour to fuel the country's economic development. While Pasifika comprised one-third of overstayers, they accounted for 86% of those arrested and prosecuted. In response to domestic opposition, criticism from New Zealand's Pacific neighbours, and the failure of the raids to ease New Zealand's economic problems, the Third National Government ended the Dawn Raids in 1979.

In 2000, the Fifth Labour Government granted an amnesty to 7,000 long-term overstayers, which allowed them to apply for New Zealand citizenship. In 2020, three separate petitions seeking an amnesty for overstayers and other changes to help migrants were submitted to the New Zealand Parliament. According to figures released by the Ministry of Business, Innovation and Employment (MBIE) in 2017, the top five nationalities with the highest number of overstayers in New Zealand were Tongans (2,498), Samoans (1,549), Chinese (1,529), Indians (1,310), and Malaysians (790). These individuals were temporary visa holders who had either not returned to their home countries once their visas had expired, renewed them, or upgraded them to residency visas. Overstayers can appeal their deportation notices to the Immigration and Protection Tribunal which has granted residency on humanitarian grounds such as family connections to New Zealand.

In February 2022, a study published by Unitec Institute of Technology estimated there were between 13,000 and 14,000 overstayers or undocumented migrants in New Zealand, citing an interview with Immigration New Zealand Stephen Vaughan. This figure included around 500–600 Tuvaluans. These overstayers are people who have overstayed their work and study visas and been unable to renew them. Many of these overstayers have trouble accessing education, health, and social services due to their undocumented status.

In February 2022, a report published by the Australian think tank Lowy Institute found that New Zealand had deported 1,040 people to the Pacific Islands between 2013 and 2018. Of this number, 400 were criminals including members of the Head Hunters Motorcycle Club. The report's author Jose Sousa-Santos argued that New Zealand, Australia and the United States' deportation policies were fuelling a spike in organised crime and drug trafficking in several Pacific countries including Samoa, Tonga, Fiji, Kiribati, Nauru, Tuvalu and Vanuatu. The Sousa-Santos report estimated that most of the deportees were males between the ages of 25 and 35 years, who had spent more than twelve years away from their countries of origin. Several had connections to organised crime in their former host countries. In response to the Sousa-Santos report, Immigration Minister Kris Faafoi stated that the New Zealand Government carefully considered deportations including family and individual circumstances while retaining the right to deport those who had breached their visa conditions and the law while living and working in New Zealand.

In early September 2025, RNZ estimated there were 20,980 visa overstayers in New Zealand, citing figures released by Immigration New Zealand. Based on data accumulated over a 30-year period, the top ten nationalities of overstayers were Tonga (2,599), China (2,577), the United States (2,213), Samoa (1,697), India (1,583), the United Kingdom (1,256), the Philippines (938), Malaysia (753), Canada (510) and Germany (498). Immigration Minister Erica Stanford said that 1,259 overstayers had departed New Zealand in 2024–2025 financial year either voluntarily or through deportations. On 4 September, Stanford confirmed that the Government would amend immigration legislation to make it easier to deport non-citizens who had resided in the country for 20 years.

=== Repatriation to New Zealand ===
In December 2014, Peter Dutton became the new Australian Minister for Immigration and Border Protection. That same month, the Australian Government amended the Migration Act 1958 to impose a character test (known as Section 501) on non-citizens and visa applications. Under the new law, individuals who had served a prison term of at least twelve months are eligible to have their visas cancelled and be deported. Prior to 2015, Australia had deported between 50 and 85 New Zealanders per year. As Immigration Minister, Dutton swiftly implemented the new character test policy. Between 1 January 2015 and 30 August 2019, 1,865 New Zealanders were repatriated back to New Zealand. In addition, the number of New Zealanders held at Australian immigration detention centres rose to 300 in 2015. By December 2019, New Zealand nationals accounted for over half (roughly 51–56%) of Australian visa cancellations.

Australia has a large New Zealand diaspora community, which numbered 650,000 as of December 2019. While New Zealanders are eligible for a non-permanent Special Category Visa (SCV) which allows them unique rights to live and work in Australia, SCV holders are ineligible for Australian social security benefits, student loans, and lack a clear path to acquiring Australian citizenship. Following a tightening of Australian immigration policies in 2001, New Zealanders residing in Australia were required to obtain permanent residency before applying for Australian citizenship, which led to a decline in the number of New Zealanders acquiring Australian citizenship. By 2016, only 8.4 per cent of the 146,000 New Zealand–born migrants who arrived in Australia between 2002 and 2011 had acquired Australian citizenship. Of this figure, only 3 per cent of New Zealand–born Māori had acquired Australian citizenship by 2018. During that same period the number of New Zealand-born prisoners in Australian prisons rose by 42% between 2009 and 2016.

Following high-level meetings between New Zealand Prime Minister John Key and his Australian counterparts Tony Abbott and Malcolm Turnbull, the Australian Government agreed to give New Zealand authorities more warning about the repatriation of deportees and to allow New Zealanders detained at Australian immigration detention centres to fly home while they appealed their visa cancellations. The Fifth National Government also passed Returning Offenders (Management and Information) Act 2015 in November 2015 which established a strict monitoring returning for 501 returnees. The law allows the chief executive of the Department of Corrections to apply to a district court to impose special conditions on returning prisoners including submitting photographs and fingerprints. While the Returning Offenders Act's strict monitoring regime reduced recidivism rates from 58% in November 2015 to 38% by March 2018, the New Zealand Law Society expressed concern that the act potentially violated the New Zealand Bill of Rights Act 1990 by imposing "retroactive penalties and double jeopardy" on former offenders.

In December 2019, Stuff reported that a total of 1,865 New Zealanders had been deported from Australia between January 2015 and August 2019. Since many former deportees lacked family ties, jobs, or homes in New Zealand, many subsequently relapsed into criminal behaviour. According to figures released by the New Zealand Police, one third of these deportees had been convicted of at least one offense since their arrival including dishonesty (1,065), traffic offenses (789), violence (578), and drugs/anti-social behaviour (394). In addition, the repatriation of New Zealanders led to a surge in organised criminal activity in New Zealand. Several repatriated members of Australian bikie gangs including the Comanchero and Mongols expanded their operations. According to Detective Superintendent Greg Williams, the repatriated "bikies" introduced a new level of "professionalism, criminal tradecraft, encrypted technologies and significant international connections" to the New Zealand criminal underworld. In addition to boosting the methamphetamine black market, the Comanchero and Mongols used social media and luxury goods to recruit young people.

By early March 2022, 2,544 New Zealanders had been repatriated from Australia, which accounted for 96% of deportations to New Zealand since 2015. The repatriation of New Zealanders from Australia led to a surge in crime in New Zealand. According to Newshub, former 501 deportees accounted for more than 8,000 offences since 2015 including over 2,000 dishonesty convictions, 1,387 violent crime convictions, 861 drug and anti-social behavior offenses and 57 sexual crime offenses. Both Police Commissioner Andrew Coster and National Party leader Christopher Luxon attributed the increasingly aggressive nature of the New Zealand criminal underworld and growth in gang membership to the influx of former 501 deportees.

On 20 December 2022, High Court Judge Cheryl Gwyn ruled in favour of a former 501 deportee known as "G," who successfully challenged the Government's authority to impose special conditions upon his return to New Zealand. Gwyn ruled that special conditions such as ordering "G" to reside at a particularly address, supplying fingerprints and DNA, and attending rehabilitative and treatment programmes violated the New Zealand Bill of Rights Act 1990 and constituted an act of double jeopardy since he had already served time for crimes in Australia which had led to his repatriation to New Zealand. Gwyn's decision has implications for the Returning Offenders (Management and Information) Act 2015, which allowed the New Zealand Government to impose special conditions on returning prisoners. On 21 December, the Crown Law Office appealed against Gwyn's High Court ruling, citing its implications on the monitoring regime established by the Returning Offenders (Management and Information) Act 2015.

== Statistics ==
Permanent and long-term migration to New Zealand by country of last residence, December year 2019–25
Country	Gross arrivals						
Country	2019	2020	2021	2022	2023	2024	2025
Mainland China	8,338	2,160	3,048	9,882	24,780	15,713	15,510
Australia	16,537	14,614	14,930	15,587	10,415	11,887	13,853
India	8,957	4,681	2,413	7,753	27,644	16,941	10,817
United Kingdom	11,185	7,018	6,481	6,783	8,181	7,950	7,793
Philippines	5,597	1,506	1,231	7,096	21,703	8,477	6,309
United States	4,388	2,912	2,463	3,639	5,100	4,315	5,212
Sri Lanka	1,034	420	250	1,595	4,640	4,238	4,166
France	3,710	1,105	331	1,682	2,639	3,265	3,518
Japan	2,507	684	581	1,347	2,951	3,207	3,160
Canada	2,733	1,252	1,128	1,615	1,897	2,191	2,486
Samoa	1,874	589	1,222	1,444	2,119	2,093	2,392
Germany	3,220	859	498	1,666	2,406	2,333	2,363
South Korea	2,708	1,024	528	1,444	2,453	2,132	2,268
South Africa	9,174	3,296	1,016	4,908	7,339	3,568	1,825
Fiji	1,681	572	424	2,568	8,784	3,594	1,796
Nepal	519	278	44	380	1,327	1,255	1,680
Singapore	1,074	639	906	1,728	2,465	1,842	1,665
Vietnam	1,075	420	191	780	4,515	1,661	1,431
Malaysia	1,064	420	614	1,594	1,599	1,291	1,396
United Arab Emirates	1,065	679	629	1,009	2,701	1,422	1,283
Taiwan	725	291	336	921	1,536	1,181	1,211
Bangladesh	111	58	56	161	591	565	1,103
Spain	308	156	130	275	478	615	1,078
Indonesia	607	313	232	511	981	913	1,075
Hong Kong SAR	829	722	850	905	775	909	1,031
Thailand	835	470	455	816	1,444	1,034	1,022
Total	110,473	55,278	48,815	95,114	185,204	129,159	118,851

Countries of birth of New Zealand residents, 2001–23 census
Country	2001 census		2006 census		2013 census		2018 census		2023 census	
Country	Number	%	Number	%	Number	%	Number	%	Number	%
New Zealand	2,890,869	80.54	2,960,217	77.09	2,980,824	74.85	3,370,122	72.60	3,525,744	71.19
England	178,203	4.96	202,401	5.27	215,589	5.41	210,915	4.54	208,428	4.21
Mainland China	38,949	1.09	78,117	2.03	89,121	2.24	132,906	2.86	145,371	2.94
India	20,892	0.58	43,341	1.13	67,176	1.69	117,348	2.53	142,920	2.89
Philippines	10,134	0.28	15,285	0.40	37,299	0.94	67,632	1.46	99,264	2.00
South Africa	26,061	0.73	41,676	1.09	54,276	1.36	71,382	1.54	95,577	1.93
Australia	56,259	1.57	62,742	1.63	62,712	1.57	75,696	1.63	86,322	1.74
Fiji	25,722	0.72	37,746	0.98	52,755	1.32	62,310	1.34	68,829	1.39
Samoa	47,118	1.31	50,649	1.32	50,661	1.27	55,512	1.20	61,494	1.24
United States	13,344	0.37	17,748	0.46	21,462	0.54	27,678	0.60	31,779	0.64
South Korea	17,931	0.50	28,809	0.75	26,601	0.67	30,975	0.67	31,689	0.64
Tonga	18,051	0.50	20,520	0.53	22,416	0.56	26,856	0.58	29,328	0.59
Scotland	28,680	0.80	29,016	0.76	25,953	0.65	26,136	0.56	24,621	0.50
Malaysia	11,460	0.32	14,547	0.38	16,353	0.41	19,860	0.43	22,521	0.45
Sri Lanka	6,168	0.17	7,257	0.19	9,582	0.24	14,349	0.31	19,470	0.39
Netherlands	22,239	0.62	22,104	0.58	19,815	0.50	19,329	0.42	17,484	0.35
Germany	8,379	0.23	10,761	0.28	12,942	0.32	16,605	0.36	16,263	0.33
Hong Kong	11,301	0.31	7,686	0.20	7,059	0.18	10,992	0.24	13,308	0.27
Canada	7,773	0.22	8,994	0.23	9,576	0.24	11,928	0.26	12,894	0.26
Japan	8,622	0.24	9,573	0.25	10,269	0.26	13,107	0.28	12,723	0.26
Cook Islands	15,222	0.42	14,697	0.38	12,954	0.33	11,925	0.26	12,303	0.25
Vietnam	3,948	0.11	4,875	0.13	6,153	0.15	9,291	0.20	11,964	0.24
Thailand	5,154	0.14	6,159	0.16	7,722	0.19	10,251	0.22	11,955	0.24
Taiwan	12,486	0.35	10,764	0.28	8,988	0.23	10,440	0.22	10,899	0.22
Brazil	657	0.02	1,764	0.05	3,588	0.09	7,719	0.17	10,647	0.21
Ireland	6,729	0.19	6,888	0.18	9,045	0.23	10,494	0.23	10,308	0.21
Zimbabwe	2,886	0.08	8,151	0.21	8,100	0.20	8,685	0.19	9,045	0.18
United Kingdom (nfd)	615	0.02	642	0.02	2,088	0.05	14,601	0.31	8,691	0.18
Russia	2,916	0.08	4,581	0.12	5,466	0.14	7,776	0.17	8,532	0.17
Cambodia	4,773	0.13	5,856	0.15	6,570	0.16	7,689	0.17	8,118	0.16
Wales	5,787	0.16	6,756	0.18	6,711	0.17	7,776	0.17	7,905	0.16
Indonesia	3,792	0.11	4,614	0.12	4,914	0.12	6,627	0.14	7,569	0.15
Singapore	3,909	0.11	4,857	0.13	5,370	0.13	6,741	0.15	7,566	0.15
France	1,617	0.05	2,472	0.06	3,759	0.09	7,539	0.16	7,476	0.15
Pakistan	1,320	0.04	2,211	0.06	2,850	0.07	5,691	0.12	6,690	0.14
Nepal					1,410	0.04	3,681	0.08	6,174	0.12
Afghanistan					2,445	0.06	3,744	0.08	6,087	0.12
Chile					2,406	0.06	3,936	0.08	5,661	0.11
Iraq	4,848	0.14	6,024	0.16	5,484	0.14	5,757	0.12	5,493	0.11
Iran					3,081	0.08	4,563	0.10	5,409	0.11
Argentina					1,701	0.04	3,447	0.07	5,370	0.11

== See also ==
- European settlers in New Zealand
- Demographics of New Zealand
- Europeans in Oceania
- Chinese immigration to New Zealand
- The Vogel Era

== Bibliography ==
- Belgrave, Michael (2024). Becoming Aotearoa: A New History of New Zealand. Auckland: Massey University Press. ISBN 9780995131866.
- King, Michael (2003). The Penguin History of New Zealand. Auckland: Penguin Books. ISBN 0143018671.
- McMillan, K. (2006). "Immigration policy". In Miller, Raymond (ed.). New Zealand Government and Politics. Oxford University Press. pp. 639–650. ISBN 9780195584929.
- Parker, John (2005). Frontier of Dreams: The Story of New Zealand—Into the 21st Century, 1946–2005. Auckland: TVNZ and Scholastic. pp. 28–29, 64–65.
- Phillips, Jock (1 August 2015). "History of immigration". Te Ara - the Encyclopedia of New Zealand. Archived from the original on 24 July 2025.
- Werry, Philippa (2023). New Zealand Immigration. Auckland: Oratia Books. ISBN 9781990042393.
