= HRF =

HRF may refer to:

- Croatian Radio Festival (Croatian: Hrvatski radijski festival)
- Haemodynamic response function
- Haiti Reconstruction Fund
- Heterocyclic ring fission, a fragmentation scheme in mass spectrometry; see A-type proanthocyanidin
- Hind Rajab Foundation
- Homeland Reserve Forces, a branch of the Republic of Korea Reserve Forces
- Hormone-releasing factor, hormones whose main purpose is to control the release of other hormones
- Hostage Rescue Force, an Egyptian police unit
- Hostile Resting Face, an unintentionally annoyed-looking facial expression
- HRF, a Rockwell scale of materials' hardness
- Human-Readable Format
- Human Relief Foundation
- Human Rights First
- Human Rights Foundation
- Human Rights Foundation (New Zealand)
- Swedish Hotel and Restaurant Workers' Union (Swedish: Hotell och Restaurang Facket)
- Hailemariam and Roman Foundation
