= Zaoui v Attorney-General (No 2) =

2006 New Zealand judicial decision

- Court: Supreme Court of New Zealand
- Decided: 21 June 2005
- Citation: [2005] NZSC 38; [2006] 1 NZLR 289
- Transcript: Available here

Case history
- Prior action: High Court [2004] 2 NZLR 339; Court of Appeal [2005] 1 NZLR 690.

Court membership
- Judges sitting: Elias CJ, Gault, Keith, Blanchard and Eichelbaum JJ

Keywords
- Immigration, Refugees, Human Rights, National security

Zaoui v Attorney-General (No 2) was the final judicial decision concerning Algerian refugee Ahmed Zaoui before the objections of the Security Intelligence Service concerning Zaoui's alleged threat to national security were withdrawn in September 2007, allowing him to remain in New Zealand. The judgment of the Supreme Court of New Zealand was concerned with the proper interpretation of article 33 of the United Nations Convention Relating to the Status of Refugees 1951 and section 72 of the Immigration Act 1987.

== Judgment ==
Justice Keith delivered the Supreme Court's judgment.

=== Article 33, Convention Relating to the Status of Refugees ===
The Court began by noting that as Zaoui had been granted refugee status by the Refugee Status Appeals Authority in 2003 he was protected by article 33, paragraph 1, of the United Nations Convention Relating to the Status of Refugees 1951:

1. No Contracting State shall expel or return ("refouler") a refugee in any manner whatsoever to the frontiers of territories where his life or freedom would be threatened on account of his race, religion, nationality, membership of a particular social group or political opinion.

However paragraph 2 of article 33 states that the benefit of this protection may not be claimed by a refugee, "whom there are reasonable grounds for regarding as a danger to the security of the country in which he is, or who, having been convicted by a final judgment of a particularly serious crime, constitutes a danger to the community of that country."

In conclusion on this point the Court held,

We accordingly conclude that the judgment or assessment to be made under art 33.2 is to be made in its own terms, by reference to danger to the security, in this case, of New Zealand, and without any balancing or weighing or proportional reference to the matter dealt with in art 33.1, the threat, were Mr Zaoui to be expelled or returned, to his life or freedom on the proscribed grounds or the more specific rights protected by the New Zealand Bill of Rights Act 1990 read with the International Covenant on Civil and Political Rights and the Convention against Torture and other Cruel, Inhuman or Degrading Treatment or Punishment. Paragraph 2 of art 33 of the Refugee Convention states a single standard.

=== Part 4A, Immigration Act 1987 ===
Part 4A of the Immigration Act concerned the use of security information in immigration situations and set out the powers of the Director of Security in issuing a security risk certificate and the process of appeal to the Inspector-General of Intelligence and Security. Counsel for Zaoui, Rodney Harrison QC, had submitted to the court that in doing their review, the Inspector-General is, "obliged to determine the potential adverse consequences for the individual; those consequences are then to be weighed against the claimed danger to the security of New Zealand."

The Court held, on the contrary to Harrison's submission, that there was no obligation by the Inspector-General to consider any threat to Zaoui at this stage of the process:

[W]e conclude that in carrying out his function under Part 4A of the Immigration Act the Inspector-General is concerned only to determine whether the relevant security criteria – here s 72 and art 33.2 – are satisfied. He is not to determine whether Mr Zaoui is subject to a threat which would or might prevent his removal from New Zealand.

=== Section 72, Immigration Act 1987 ===
Section 72 of the Immigration Act 1987 states, "Where the Minister certifies that the continued presence in New Zealand of any person named in the certificate constitutes a threat to national security, the Governor-General may, by Order in Council, order the deportation from New Zealand of that person."

On this point the Court held, "As directed by s 6 of the Bill of Rights, s 72 is to be given a meaning, if it can be, consistent with the rights and freedoms contained in it, including the right not to be arbitrarily deprived of life and not to be subjected to torture. Those rights in turn are to be interpreted and the powers conferred by s 72 are to be exercised, if the wording will permit, so as to be in accordance with international law, both customary and treaty-based."

In addition the Court directed that no person may be deported under s 72, if the Executive Council, "are satisfied that there are substantial grounds for believing that, as a result of the deportation, the person would be in danger of being arbitrarily deprived of life or of being subjected to torture or to cruel, inhuman or degrading treatment or punishment."

=== Analysis ===
In essence Zaoui v Attorney-General (No 2) was a case about New Zealand's non-refoulement obligations, the application of the exceptions to those obligations, and how these obligations work in practice alongside New Zealand's domestic legislative processes. An example of New Zealand's non-refoulement obligations stem from article 33 of the Convention Relating to the Status of Refugees 1951, which prevents a state from refoulement of a refugee where their "life or freedom would be threatened on account of [their] race, religion, nationality, membership of a particular social group or political opinion." A second example can be found in article 3 of the Convention against Torture and Other Cruel, Inhuman or Degrading Treatment or Punishment 1984, which prevents a state party from returning a person who "would be in danger of being subjected to torture." What this means is that state parties to these conventions are unable to expel people from their territories if doing so would expose that person to a danger of being tortured. Neither could a party-state expel, extradite, or return (refouler) a refugee if their race, religion, nationality, social group, or political opinion meant that their life or freedom would be under threat. The purpose of these articles is to protect people from being delivered, by a state, into the control of another state which would breach the person's human rights. In this way, New Zealand's "non-refoulement" obligations have been seen to become an obligation to protect a person's human rights in that context. This is especially clear in article 3 of the Convention against Torture and Other Cruel, Inhuman or Degrading Treatment or Punishment 1984, where it stipulates that a state must give consideration to "a consistent pattern of gross, flagrant or mass violations of human rights" in the State concerned. In Zaoui v Attorney-General (No 2), the court acknowledged that "Mr Zaoui, supported by the ruling of the RSAA, fears that if he were removed to Algeria [...] he would be subject to the threat of torture or arbitrary deprivation of his life." Article 33.1 was therefore relevant and the Court's determination was with regard to its application in New Zealand's processes.

There are, however, some qualifications and exceptions to this obligation. Most notably article 33.2 which holds that a refugee may not rely on a state's non-refoulement obligation where there are reasonable grounds that the refugee poses "a danger to the security of that country in which he is" or "constitutes a danger to the community of that country." It was article 33.2 which the New Zealand authorities were relying on because through the application of article 33.2 the New Zealand authority be free from their non-refoulement obligation under article 33 to Mr Zaoui and would be able to return him to Algeria. It was not a matter before the court whether or not Mr Zaoui came under article 33.2, what was subject to judgement was the application of this article by New Zealand authorities. Essentially the Court's first order of business was to measure New Zealand's non-refoulement obligation against the exception of article 33.2. What was then important was article 33.2's application under part 4A of the Immigration Act 1987, specifically the relevant and mandatory considerations of the Director of Security in determining whether or not Mr Zaoui did constitute a danger under article 33.2. The court held at para 42 and later at para 52 that "those applying article 33.2 under Part 4A of the Immigration Act are to apply it in its own terms." What this means is that there is no obligation to consider the human rights of the person, or the state's obligations, when determining whether or not they constitute a danger under article 33.2. What is important to note is that this concerns this stage of the process, the stage where an authority is determining whether the individual falls under article 33.2. In the New Zealand process, once the authority is satisfied that the person in question falls under article 33.2 through part 4A of the Immigration Act 1987 and has issued a security risk certificate, the next step was to turn to section 72 of the Immigration Act.

This is where the Court made the most important finding in its judgement. Section 72 sets out when the Governor-General may make a deportation order. Here the Court, citing section 6 of the New Zealand Bill of Rights Act 1990, ruled that section 72 must be interpreted in a manner "that is consistent with the rights and freedoms contained in this Bill of Rights". The Court went further and said that not only must the powers under s72 be exercised in accordance with the rights in the Bill of Rights but also "be in accordance with international law". Justice Keith cited this reason for this expansion by reference to paragraph (b) of the Bill of Rights' title which "says that it is an Act to affirm New Zealand's commitment to the ICCPR" However what makes Zaoui v Attorney-General (No 2) so significant is the final paragraph that creates the obligation on decision makers to not certify or advise in favour of deportation under section 72 "if they are satisfied that there are substantial grounds for believing that, as a result of that deportation, the person would be in danger of being arbitrarily deprived of life or of being subjected to torture or to cruel, inhuman or degrading treatment or punishment." In this way, Zaoui v Attorney-General (No 2) held that New Zealand decision-makers are bound by the non-refoulement obligations in the Convention Against Torture and implied obligations in the International Covenant on Civil and Political Rights in spite of the exceptions like that found in article 33.2. This Supreme Court decision gives weight to human rights in New Zealand, and shows a presumption of the courts that Parliament intended to legislate consistently with the country's international obligations. Mr Zaoui was protected from deportation and refoulement.

== Criticisms ==
Commentator Rodger Haines QC is critical of the Court's decision, believing that it has "erected an apparently absolute bar to expulsion from New Zealand no matter how grave a threat the individual might be to the security of the nation or to its community." There are some common law practices, in other jurisdictions, which may be applicable in finding that there is no absolute bar to expulsion. One such practice is that of legitimate expectation – where an authority could indicate that they do indeed intend to act inconsistently with an international obligation and therefore override the Court's presumption. Setting this aside however, there were some considerations the Court did not give attention to. One is that art 1F of the Convention Relating to the Status of Refugees 1951, stipulates that the "provisions of this Convention shall not apply to any person" who has "committed a crime against peace, a war crime, or a crime against humanity, [...] a serious non-political crime outside of the country of refuge [... or is] guilty of acts contrary to the purposes and principles of the United Nations." However, the Supreme Court decision in Zaoui has created "an obligation to protect from expulsion or return everyone", and taken their decision further than creating a presumption of legislating consistently with international obligations and extended protection further than the Convention did. Haines also remarks that "there is the implicit assertion that no matter how extreme the danger to the community an individual may be, the risk of that individual being subjected to arbitrary deprivation of life or to torture trumps all other considerations." In extreme cases, where a refugee may pose a threat to a community, a State may be bound to find that the rights and interests of that community are subservient to those of the non-citizen. Commentators find this especially problematic as the Supreme Court made no effort to "explain why New Zealand should provide a safe haven for war criminals, genocidaires, suspected terrorists and other criminals." Zaoui v Attorney-General (No 2) therefore has potentially wide reaching consequences.

== Legal developments since the decision ==
Zaoui v Attorney-General (No 2) was decided in 2005, and focused heavily on the application of the Immigration Act 1987. Since then Parliament has made updates to the law with the passing of the Immigration Act 2009, and the Courts have seen a rise in "the deployment of international law arguments in domestic litigation." This has created a "general trend towards greater judicial receptivity to international law." It is important to note that the judiciary is not solely responsible for the increase in this approach, the executive branch of Government entered into these international obligations and Parliament implemented statutes that gave power to those obligations with the New Zealand Bill of Rights Act affirming New Zealand's commitment to the ICCPR and sections that allude to terms of Conventions like Part 4A of the 1987 Immigration Act. In saying this, the Court's "expansive approach in Zaoui to the application of the presumption of consistency thus reflects a posture of profound receptivity to international law as a source of authority within the domestic legal system." This emphasizes the extent to which the judiciary is prepared to go to protect human rights.

Since Zaoui, New Zealand's Parliament has followed the judiciary's lead by codifying the practices of the conventions and the ruling of the Supreme Court within part 5 of the Immigration Act 2009. This is particularly evident in sections 130 and 131 which cover "protected persons" status and the mandatory human rights considerations that a decision maker must consider. Section 164 (1) in particular states that "No person who is recognised as a refugee or a protected person in New Zealand, or who is a claimant, may be deported under this Act." The statute only allows deportation for individuals who are not protected persons under section 164 (3) in accordance with Articles 32.1 and 33 of the Refugee Convention, which means that this section does not apply to individuals who are not at risk of torture or arbitrary deprivation of life. Section 164 (4) does apply to those at risk individuals but explicitly handles deporting them in a manner which would not put them at risk, by deporting them from New Zealand not to their State of origin but elsewhere. In essence Parliament took the decision of Zaoui and codified it explicitly into legislation.

== See also ==
- Ahmed Zaoui
- Convention Relating to the Status of Refugees 1951
- Convention against Torture and other Cruel, Inhuman or Degrading Treatment or Punishment
- New Zealand Bill of Rights Act 1990
