= RSAA =

RSAA may refer to:

- Refugee Status Appeals Authority, an appeal body of New Zealand
- Royal Society for Asian Affairs, a learned society based in the United Kingdom
