= Teitiota v Chief Executive Ministry of Business, Innovation and Employment =

Teitiota v Chief Executive Ministry of Business, Innovation and Employments
- Court: Court of Appeal
- Decided: 8 May 2014
- Citation: [2014] NZCA 173; [2014] NZAR 688.

Case history
- Prior action: [2013] NZHC 3125
- Subsequent action: [2015] NZSC 107

Court membership
- Judges sitting: Stevens, Wild and Miller JJ

Keywords
- Environmental refugee, Kiribati, immigration, climate change

Teitiota v Chief Executive Ministry of Business, Innovation and Employment concerned an application by a Kiribati man, Ioane Teitiota, for leave to appeal against a decision of New Zealand's Immigration and Protection Tribunal that declined to grant him refugee and/or protected person status. Teitiota's case became a cause célèbre for environmentalists and human rights activists as it made its way towards the Supreme Court. Teitiota was declined application for leave to appeal to the Supreme Court in July 2015. In September 2015 Teitiota was placed in police custody and deported back to Kiribati.

Teitiota's case gained international media attention as being that of the world's first climate change refugee. As Kenneth R. Weiss wrote, "Consequently, over the past year, this 38-year-old migrant farmworker has become an unlikely international celebrity, a stand-in for the thousands of people in Kiribati—as well as millions more worldwide—expected to be forced from their homes due to rising seas and other disruptions on a warming planet. Teitiota is a contender to become the world's first climate refugee, albeit an accidental one."

Teitiota challenged his removal under the International Covenant on Civil and Political Rights. In October 2019, the UN Human Rights Committee declared his communication admissible but found no violation of Teitiota's right to life.

== Background ==
Teitiota and his wife arrived in New Zealand from Kiribati in 2007 and continued to reside in the country illegally after the expiration of their permits. The couple have two children who were born in New Zealand but are not entitled to New Zealand citizenship. After being arrested, Teitiota applied for refugee or protected person status, which was declined by an immigration official.

Teitiota appealed the decision of the immigration official to the Immigration and Protection Tribunal,

[39] The Tribunal finds that the limited capacity of South Tarawa to carry its population is being significantly compromised by the effects of population growth, urbanisation, and limited infrastructure development, particularly in relation to sanitation. The negative impacts of these factors on the carrying capacity of the land on Tarawa atoll are being exacerbated by the effects of both sudden onset environmental events (storms) and slow-onset processes (sea level rise).

[40] As for the appellant, the Tribunal finds the appellant is from Kiribati and has been living with his wife’s family in their village on South Tarawa. For a number of years prior to coming to New Zealand in 2007, he was unemployed, relying on subsistence agriculture and fishing, supplemented by support from his wife’s brother who is in employment there. Concerned about the coastal erosion which he witnessed from 2000 onwards and the increasing intrusion of salt water onto the land during high tides, and aware of the debate around climate change, the appellant and his wife came to New Zealand in 2007. They have three children born here.

[41] The appellant does not wish to return to Kiribati because of the difficulties they faced due to the combined pressures of over-population and sea-level-rise. The house they were living in on South Tarawa is no longer available to them on a long term basis. Although their families have land on other islands, these face similar environmental pressures and the land available is of limited size and has other family members living there.

— Immigration and Protection Tribunal, Judgment of 5 June 2013

Counsel for Teitiota sought leave to appeal the judgment of the Tribunal on questions of law unsuccessfully in the High Court before seeking the leave of the Court of Appeal.

== Judgment ==
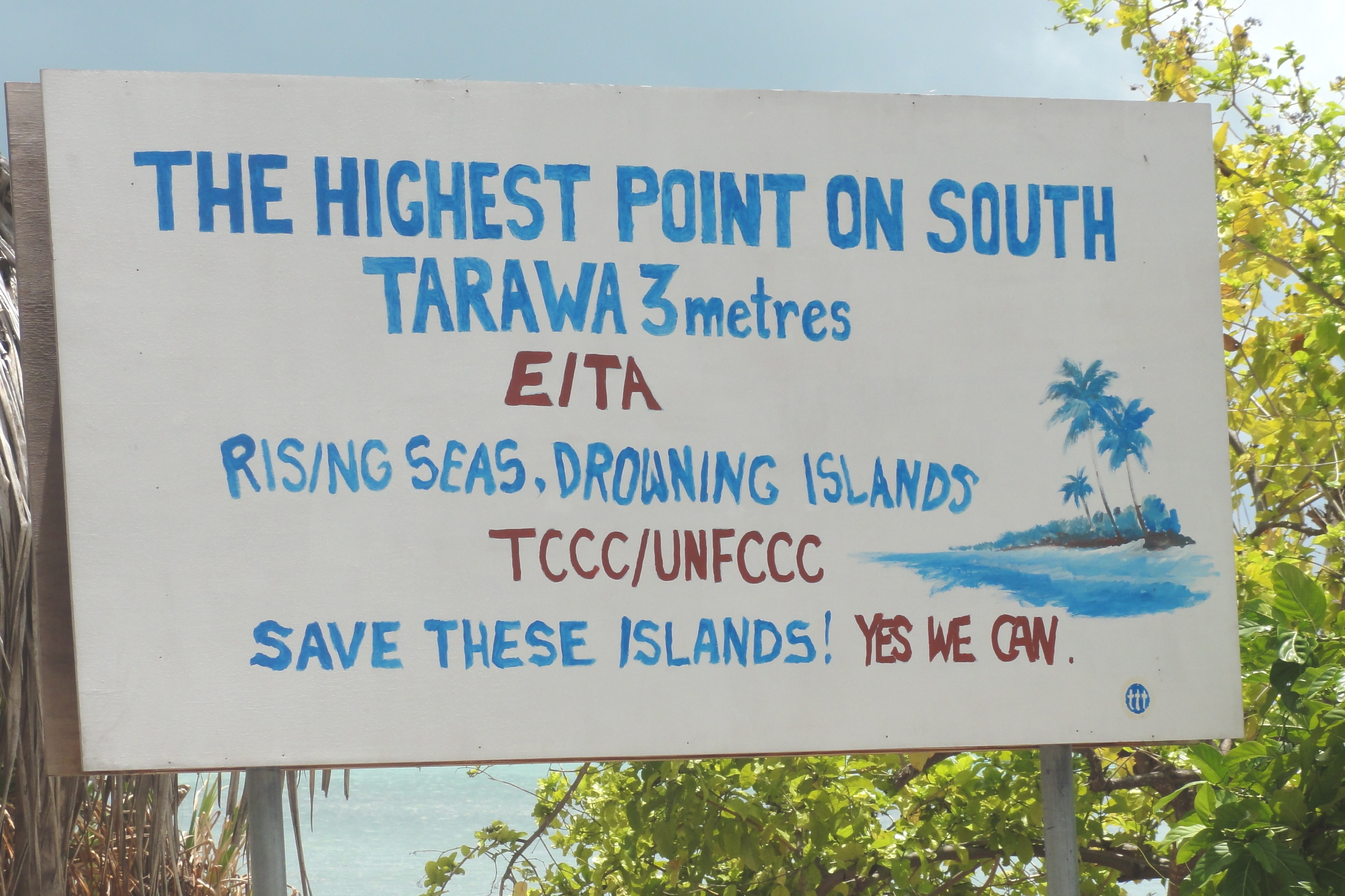
As an extremely low-lying country, surrounded by vast oceans, Kiribati is at risk from the negative effects of climate change, such as sea-level rise and storm surges.

Counsel for Teitiota raised six questions of law in their application for leave to appeal. The Court dismissed the application for leave to appeal as they found no arguable case on any of the questions of law raised. The judgment of the Court was delivered by Justice Wild.

The first question of law dealt with by Wild J was

As the word “refugee” constitutes and incorporates those who are refugees by way of climate change and its effects, did the Tribunal err in law in using the term “sociological refugee” to distinguish what could amount to valid grounds for Mr Teitiota to seek refugee status?

Wild J held that the Tribunal had correctly defined refugee in the context of the Immigration Act 2009, which imports the definition of the United Nations Convention Relating to the Status of Refugees. Refugees were those persons,

... owing to well-founded fear of being persecuted for reasons of race, religion, nationality, membership of a particular social group or political opinion, is outside the country of his nationality and is unable or, owing to such fear, is unwilling to avail himself of the protection of that country; or who, not having a nationality and being outside the country of his former habitual residence as a result of such events, is unable or, owing to such fear, is unwilling to return to it.

Furthermore, Wild J held that the Tribunal had correctly defined the meaning of, "being persecuted" [which] rested on human agency, although it could encompass non-state actors. It accepted the requirement for some form of human agency did not mean climate change could never “create pathways into the Refugee Convention or protected person jurisdiction". And Wild J held that Tribunal's reasoning that Teitiota would not be persecuted if returned to Kiribati was legally sound.

The second question dealt with by the Court concerned whether the Tribunal's ruling erred in law when it found that because everyone in Kiribati would suffer from climate change, Teitiota was disqualified from refugee status. Wild J held that the second question was a reformulation of the first, and that the part of the judgment Teitiota was appealing merely expressed the view that he was not being persecuted under one of the five protected grounds - race, religion, nationality, membership of a social group, or holding a political opinion. The third question concerned whether the Tribunal had erred by not failing to consider that climate change was caused by indirect human agency. Wild J said, "the question is not open for serious argument". Questions four and five concerned the effect of returning to Kiribati on Teitiota's children. On these questions Wild J approved the decision in the High Court where Priestly J had ruled that on these points there was no identifiable error of law.

Kiribati comprises 33 atolls and reef islands and one raised coral island, Banaba. They have a total land area of 800 square kilometres (310 sq mi), and are dispersed over 3.5 million square kilometres, (1,351,000 square miles).

The sixth question concerned whether the Tribunal had made an error of law by finding that in Kiribati supplies of food and water are adequate. Wild J held this question was not open to serious argument,

Certainly, there was evidence from each of Mr Teitiota, Mr Corcoran and Mr Teitiota’s wife, that the rise in the level of the Pacific Ocean is adversely affecting homes, crops, coconut palms and fresh water supplies in Kiribati. At high tides and king tides, seawater sometimes comes into coastal homes. Salt water has killed some coconut palms and crops. It has contaminated drinking water drawn from wells. But the Tribunal was right to find that the supplies of food and water for Mr Teitiota and his family would be adequate if they were required to return to Kiribati. The Tribunal readily accepted that the standard of living of the Teitiota family back in Kiribati would compare unfavourably to that it enjoyed in New Zealand. But the Tribunal was, on the evidence it heard, entitled to find that Mr Teitiota and his family on return to Kiribati could “resume their prior subsistence life with dignity“.

— Wild J, Teitiota v Chief Executive of Ministry of Business, Innovation and Employment

Wild J concluded the judgment by stating,

No-one should read this judgment as downplaying the importance of climate change. It is a major and growing concern for the international community. The point this judgment makes is that climate change and its effect on countries like Kiribati is not appropriately addressed under the Refugee Convention.

— Wild J, Teitiota v Chief Executive of Ministry of Business, Innovation and Employment
