= RASNZ =

RASNZ is a five-letter abbreviation with multiple meanings, as described below:

- Royal Astronomical Society of New Zealand, the New Zealand national astronomical society
- Refugees As Survivors New Zealand, the humanitarian NGO for refugees in New Zealand
