= Human Rights Foundation (New Zealand) =

The Human Rights Foundation of Aotearoa New Zealand is a non-governmental organisation in New Zealand, which seeks "to promote and defend human rights through research based education and advocacy."

The Foundation purports to do this by making submissions on bills that might involve human rights issues and investigating New Zealand's compliance with international obligations. The Foundation also takes an interest in human rights issues in the Pacific Islands.

The Foundation was established in December 2001 and was incorporated as a charitable trust on 23 October 2001 under the Charitable Trusts Act 1957.

== Organisation ==
Members of the Foundation can either be ordinary members or Foundation (Life) Members, depending on the membership fee paid.

The Officers of the Human Rights Foundation are its Patron, the Chairperson, the Secretary and the Treasurer, who are all selected by an election. Control of the Foundation resides with a Management Committee, consisting of the Chairperson, the Secretary, the Treasurer and up to eight committee members.

The Human Rights Foundation's current Chairperson is Peter Hosking, who comes from a legal background and has worked in the human rights field. Hosking has been a consultant to the United Nations Office of the High Commissioner for Human Rights and to the United Nations Development Programme. He was also formerly the Proceedings Commissioner for the New Zealand Human Rights Commission.

Former Governor-General of New Zealand Dame Silvia Cartwright is the Patron of the Foundation.

Members of the Management Committee include Margaret Bedggood, who was the Chief Commissioner of the Human Rights Commission (New Zealand) from 1989-1994 (during which time the Human Rights Act 1993 was passed) and was on Amnesty International's Executive Committee from 1999-2005, and Tim McBride, who wrote the New Zealand Handbook of Civil Liberties and was a founding member of the Human Rights Foundation.

== Purposes and values ==
The Foundation’s constitution states that it was established for four key purposes.

- Promoting through education an understanding of the importance of internationally recognised human rights,
- Promoting respect for human rights principles and their widespread application,
- Promoting the relevance of human rights principles to economic, social, cultural, environmental and technological developments,
- Making knowledge about human rights widely accessible

At the launch of the Human Rights Foundation on 18 December 2001, Dame Silvia Cartwright stated that it was necessary for the human rights infrastructure to have "an active civil society, to ensure grassroots participation, to hold the watchdogs accountable and to contribute a broader understanding of human rights and their implementation". She also spoke of how she had been told that the Foundation would make it a priority to "make practical and theoretical links across human rights issues".

The constitution also sets out the values upon which the Foundation operates, including respect to the Treaty of Waitangi, a concept of rights recognising both individual and group rights and the realisation of individual human potential.

== Submissions ==
The Human Rights Foundation has made a number of submissions on New Zealand bills. Some of their submissions are made in conjunction with other human rights organisations, such as the Equal Justice Project, which is an initiative run by University of Auckland students seeking to provide access to equal justice. The Foundation's submissions have included the Human Rights Amendment Bill, the Crimes of Torture Amendment Bill, the Criminal Procedure (Reform and Modernisation) Bill, the Immigration (Mass Arrivals) Amendment Bill 2012 and recently, the Government Security Bureau (GCSB) and Related Legislation Amendment Bill.

=== GCSB Bill 2013 ===
In May 2013, the Government Communications Security Bureau and Related Legislation Amendment Bill was introduced. The stated purpose of the bill was to amend the Government Communications Security Bureau Act 2003, the Inspector-General of Intelligence and Security Act 1996 and the Intelligence and Security Committee Act 1996, in order to make the statutory framework around the Bureau clearer. The bill amended the objectives, functions, powers and limitations provisions. The amendments gave the GCSB the authority to provide assistance to the New Zealand Defence Force, the New Zealand Police and the New Zealand Security Intelligence Service when carrying out their lawful functions. The amendments also clarified when the GCSB’s powers of interception can be used. Before the amendments, the Act stated that the powers could only be used for the purpose of obtaining foreign intelligence. The bill amended section 13 to say that the powers of interception could also be used for information assurance and cybersecurity. The section stating that GCSB could not conduct foreign intelligence activities against New Zealanders was adjusted so that this only applies to the foreign intelligence function, not the information assurance and cybersecurity functions.

The bill was split into three bills, the Government Communications Security Bureau Amendment Bill, the Inspector-General of Intelligence and Security Amendment Bill and the Intelligence and Security Committee Amendment Bill. They each had their third readings on the 21 August 2013 and each received Royal Assent on the 26 August 2013.

The Human Rights Foundation's submission on this bill, made extensive references to the individual's right to privacy. They expressed concern that the monitoring of individuals would also affect the right to freedom of expression, peaceful assembly and association. These rights are contained in both the New Zealand Bill of Rights Act 1990 and the International Covenant on Civil and Political Rights, which New Zealand ratified on 28 December 1978. They argued that the changes to section 14 and the insertion of new sections 15A and 15B mean that New Zealand citizens and permanent residences can be monitored in a wider range of situations. This was previously safeguarded against in the 2003 Act and the Foundation submitted that this deviation was not justified. They also stated their concern that the proposed amendments to the Intelligence and Security Committee Act 1996 would not do enough to counter the concerns about the GCSB's compliance, as raised in a report by Secretary of the Cabinet Rebecca Kitteridge.

== Shadow reports ==
Part of the Human Rights Foundation's activities is producing shadow and alternative reports. These are reports that are presented alongside official reports to United Nations monitoring bodies. On 29 November 2012 the Human Rights Foundation was awarded the New Zealand Law Foundation Shadow Report Award, providing them with a $10,000 grant to assist them with this work. The award was presented by the Law Foundation New Zealand Chair Warwick Deuchrass, who said on behalf of the Law Foundation "we believe shadow reporting is a valuable contributor to the treaty monitoring process". The Human Rights Foundation plans to use the money "to provide more in-depth reports to a wider range of UN organisations", according to Chairperson Peter Hosking.

The Human Rights Foundation's shadow and alternative reports have included the following:

- Convention on the Elimination of All Forms of Racial Discrimination (CERD) Shadow Report June 2007
- Convention Against Torture (CAT) Alternative Report April 2009
- International Convention on Civil and Political Rights (ICCPR) Alternative Report March 2010
- Convention on the Elimination of All Forms of Racial Discrimination Shadow Report January 2013

=== New Zealand's Universal Periodic Review ===
The Universal Periodic Review (UPR) is a process through which the human rights records of United Nations member states are reviewed by the Human Rights Council. The Office of the High Commissioner for Human rights states that the aim of the process is "to improve the human rights situation in all countries and address human rights violations wherever they occur."

Non-governmental organisations, such as the Human Rights Foundation, may prepare stakeholder reports to be considered alongside the official State report.

==== New Zealand's First Universal Periodic Review ====
This was considered on 7 May 2009. The Human Rights Foundation and the Equal Justice Project conducted an analysis of which of the 64 resulting recommendations were and were not accepted by the New Zealand Government.

==== New Zealand's Second Universal Periodic Review ====
For the second cycle of New Zealand's Universal Periodic Review, the Human Rights Foundation, in conjunction with Peace Movement Aotearoa, produced a coordination of the reports of non-governmental organisations wanting to contribute.

New Zealand's second UPR was considered on the 27 January 2014 and a final outcome has not currently been released by the Office of the High Commissioner for Human Rights.

Information about New Zealand and the UPR process is available here

== Refugee issues ==
=== Ahmed Zaoui ===
The Human Rights Foundation supported Ahmed Zaoui, who was granted refugee status in New Zealand by the Refugee Status Appeals Authority (RSAA) but was detained in solitary confinement due to the fact that he was issued with a National Security Risk Certificate.

The Human Rights foundation supported Zaoui by informing the public on the details of his case and by helping to raise financial assistance towards his legal expenses.

== Education ==
The Human Rights Foundation has also compiled a reference text which discusses economical, social and cultural rights in New Zealand. The book, Law into Action: Economic, Social and Cultural Rights in New Zealand, was edited by Kris Gledhill and Margret Bedggood, who is on the Management Committee of the Foundation.
