= Immigration and Protection Tribunal =

The Immigration and Protection Tribunal is a specialist, independent tribunal established in New Zealand under the Immigration Act 2009 with jurisdiction to hear appeals and applications regarding residence class visas, deportation, and claims to be recognised as a refugee or as a protected person. The tribunal is administered by the Ministry of Justice and is chaired by a District Court Judge, appointed by the Governor General on the recommendation of the Attorney-General.

== History ==
=== Refugee status claims in New Zealand ===
Since 1978, procedures have been in place for determining refugee status claims which, until October 1990, were vetted by Ministers of Foreign Affairs and Immigration, acting on advice from a committee of government officials known as the Inter-departmental Committee on Refugees. In the decision of Benipal v Ministers of Foreign Affairs and Immigration the Court recognised that the existing procedures were insufficient and, as a consequence, on 17 December 1990 new procedures were approved to deal with applications for refugee status. This led to the incorporation of procedures into the Terms of Reference and established the right of appeal to the Refugee Status Appeals Authority.

In August 2014, the Immigration and Protection Tribunal granted refugee status to Tuvalu residents due to climate change, making it the first body in the world to grant refugee status because of climate change. The news raises questions about whether other nations will follow suit.

=== The Refugee Status Appeals Authority ===
The RSAA approached issues of substantive refugee law with a wide eye, drawing on definitions from the Convention Relating to the Status of Refugees, case law from other States, and respected academics. In 1999, the Immigration Amendment Act paved the way for a larger degree of independence for refugee related appeal bodies, and subsequently the RSAA was given statutory recognition and the powers of a Commission of Inquiry.

==== Significant issues addressed by the RSAA ====
===== Civil war =====
In 1999 the RSAA was asked to investigate claims that refugee status officers had adopted an approach to civil war claims which required the claimant to establish that he or she was more at risk of persecution for an identifiable Convention reason than others. This approach derived from a number of judicial decisions. In one of such cases, Adan v Secretary of State for the Home Department, Lord Lloyd stated:

“...where a state of civil war exists, it is not enough for an asylum-seeker to show that he would be at risk if he were returned to his country. He must be able to show what Mr Pannick calls a differential impact. In other words, he must be able to show fear of persecution for Convention reasons over and above the ordinary risks of clan warfare.”

The RSAA reviewed these claims and affirmed its long standing position that there are only four situations which equate to a failure of state protection: persecution committed by the state; persecution condoned by the state; persecution tolerated by the state and persecution not condoned and not tolerated by the state but nevertheless present because the state either refuses or is unable to offer adequate protection. However, the RSAA also looked at how, in a civil war situation, a claimant can connect their anticipated harm with their race, religion, nationality, membership of a particular social group or political opinion. The RSAA said that a distinction must be made between equality of risk of harm with equality of reason for that harm. The view of the RSAA was that a person at real risk of serious harm for reason of his or her religion should not have to establish that he or she is more at risk of serious harm for reason of religion than others who are equally at real risk of serious harm for reason of their religion. In other words, the RSAA believed there was no requirement for a differential impact as suggested by Lord Lloyd above.

===== The Immigration (Transit Visas) Regulations 1998 =====
Following the May 1998 riots of Indonesia, the Minister of Immigration announced new regulations surrounding the requirement for visas for citizens travelling from certain countries. This was an attempt to prevent Indonesians of Chinese ethnicity from seeking refugee status in New Zealand in the aftermath of the violence that was taking place, particularly in Java. The RSAA ruled on a refugee claim in 1999 where it was held that any claim based on the assertion that Chinese Indonesians are at risk of persecution by virtue of their race alone is bound to fail and that the discrimination experienced by Chinese Indonesians does not rise to the level of persecution. The RSAA left open questions surrounding whether an atmosphere of insecurity is a violation of the rights to personal security as guaranteed by Article 9(1) of the International Covenant on Civil and Political Rights.

===== Internal protection alternative =====
Throughout the 1990s, the RSAA looked at whether a person who otherwise satisfies the refugee definition can be denied recognition as a refugee on the grounds that effective state protection is available in his or her country of origin. The RSAA formulated a series of issues they would employ to deal with such cases:

1. Objectively, on the facts as found, is there a real chance of the refugee claimant being persecuted if returned to their country of nationality?
2. If the answer is yes, is there a Convention reason for that persecution?

Where the issue of an internal protection alternative arises, the third and final issue to be addressed is:

3. Can the refugee claimant genuinely access domestic protection which is meaningful?

An internal protection alternative will exist only where the answer to the following is yes:

(a) In the proposed site of internal protection, is the real chance of persecution for a Convention reason eliminated?
(b) Is the proposed site of internal protection one in which there is no real chance of persecution, or of other particularly serious harms of the kind that might give rise to the risk of return to the place of origin?
(c) Do local conditions in the proposed site of internal protection meet the standard of protection prescribed by the Refugee Convention?

===== The case of Ahmed Zaoui =====
Ahmed Zaoui, an Algerian national, moved to New Zealand in 2002. Zaoui previously stood as a candidate for the Islamic Salvation Front in 1991, before fleeing to Europe in 1993 after the outbreak of the Algerian Civil War. He was convicted in absentia by the Algerian government of a number of crimes, leading to his claim that there was six life sentences against him, as well as two death sentences. He was later charged and convicted in absentia by Belgium and France for criminal related activities before arriving in New Zealand. Upon arrival in New Zealand, Zaoui sought refugee status. The RSAA dealt with his appeal but his application was opposed by the Security Intelligence Service.

In August 2003 the RSAA declared previous trials held against Zaoui to be “unsafe” and granted him refugee status. The case was highly publicised and attracted significant media and political attention. In 2007, the head of the Security Intelligence Service withdrew opposition to Zaoui’s refugee application and the New Zealand Government in turn withdrew objections.

=== The formation of the Immigration and Protection Tribunal ===
The National Government passed the new Immigration Act in 2008, calling it “the most comprehensive review of immigration law in almost quarter of a century.” The creation of an independent Immigration and Protection Tribunal (IPT) was one of the salient achievements of this new Act.

The IPT was established via combined work by the Department of Labour and the Ministry of Justice and replaces four separate appeal bodies: the Refugee Status Appeals Authority (RSAA); the Removal Review Authority (RRA); the Residence Review Board (RRB); and the Deportation Review Tribunal (DRT). Any outstanding appeals against decisions made under the Immigration Act 1987 are heard by the IPT.

== Composition ==
The IPT consists of 16 members who must have legal training and experience. They should have a practicing certificate for at least five years or the equivalent experience. The chair of the IPT is appointed by the Governor-General on the advice of the Attorney-General, given after consultation with the Minister of Justice. Every member of the IPT can hold office for a period of five years and may be reappointed. Prior to appointment, each member must swear an oath before a Judge of the High Court.

Judge Martin Treadwell is the current chair.

== Jurisdiction ==
The IPT was established as an independent, specialist judicial body under s217 of the Immigration Act 2009 to consider all immigration, deportation, refugee, and protection appeals in New Zealand. The tribunal hears and determines appeals against:

- Decisions in relation to residence class visas
- Decisions in relation to the recognition of a person as a refugee or a protected person
- Decisions to cease to recognise a person as a refugee or a protected person
- Decisions to cancel the recognition of a New Zealand citizen as a refugee or a protected person
- Liability for deportation

=== A refugee ===
A person will be recognised as a refugee if they fulfil the definition of a refugee under the 1951 Convention Relating to the Status of Refugees as well as its 1967 Protocol. This is established in the Immigration Act 2009 and in accordance with New Zealand’s status as a party to both the Convention and the Protocol.

=== Protected person ===
A person may seek to be recognised as a protected person in New Zealand under the 1984 Convention Against Torture and Other Cruel, Inhuman or Degrading Treatment or Punishment; the Convention Against Torture; or the 1966 International Covenant on Civil and Political Rights. This is established in the Immigration Act 2009 and in accordance with New Zealand’s status as a party to the aforementioned international agreements.

== Tribunal process ==
=== Notice of appeal ===
Notice of appeal or matter made to the IPT must be on one of the approved tribunal forms. This form must be completed in English, signed by the claimant and filed in the IPT office in Auckland, along with all relevant materials.

=== Notice of hearing ===
Where an oral hearing is necessary, a notice of hearing i sent to the claimant which will state the date, time and place of the hearing. This notice will also detail the procedure for submitting further evidence. Any evidence that the claimant wishes to produce on appeal must be filed within 14 days before the hearing date.

Appeals relating to residence class visas and humanitarian appeals against deportation are decided solely on the information and evidence provided, without an oral hearing being held.

=== Oral hearings ===
Oral hearings are normally conducted for refugee and protection status appeals, deportation appeals by residents/permanent residents, and for deportation appeals resulting from cancelled refugee and/or protection status persons (if involving a resident/permanent resident). The IPT may allow an oral hearing in other cases at its absolute discretion.

Hearings are open to the public, except where the appeal involves a claimant for refugee and protection status, a refugee or protected person, a person formerly recognised as a refugee or protected person and in certain other cases at the discretion of the tribunal. A claimant can represent themselves, or be represented by a lawyer or licensed immigration adviser or person exempt from licensing under the Immigration Advisers Licensing Act 2007. Applications can be made for legal aid.

The IPT may receive as evidence any statement, document, information or matter that may assist it in the proceedings, whether or not it would be admissible in a court of law. The hearings will be conducted in an investigative manner and a decision will be reached on the facts as found at the time of the appeal.

=== Decisions and further appeals ===
The majority decision of the members of the IPT prevails, and where there is an even split the appeal will be decided in favour of the claimant.

Appeals are restricted to questions of law. Any party to an appeal that has been decided by the IPT who is dissatisfied with the outcome can, on a point of law with the leave of the High Court, appeal to the High Court on that point of law.

== See also ==
- Immigration to New Zealand
- Immigration New Zealand
- Refugee migration into New Zealand
