= Refugee Status Appeals Authority =

The New Zealand Refugee Status Appeals Authority or RSAA, was an independent authority that heard the appeals of people who had been declined refugee status by the Refugee Status Branch of the New Zealand Immigration Service. It was established in 1991, and was replaced by the Immigration and Protection Tribunal in 2010. New Zealand established the RSAA as part of its responsibility to uphold the right of asylum as a result of being a signatory of the 1951 Convention relating to the Status of Refugees and the 1967 Protocol. The decisions of the RSAA are not binding, but have had a significant impact on refugee jurisprudence.

The RSAA was composed of a chairperson and 24 Members (part-time and full-time), all of whom were either legal practitioners or retired judges. The most high-profile case adjudged by the RSAA was that of Ahmed Zaoui, whose appeal was eventually successful.

== Jurisdiction and statutory authority ==
The RSAA was created under the prerogative powers of the New Zealand Executive (Cabinet) in 1991. The RSAA was later given statutory authority on October 1, 1999, in the Immigration Amendment Act 1999. The RSAA's jurisdiction allowed the body to hear and decide any appeal by a person who had been declined refugee status by a Refugee Status Officer (RSO). The RSAA also made decisions regarding direct applications, cancellation of refugee status when the Refugee Convention may have no longer applied, and when recognition of refugee status should cease due to attaining refugee status by forgery, false or misleading information or concealment of relevant information.

The authority was established to work as an independent appellate body. The RSAA was headed by the chairman who had the discretion to appoint people to hear appeals as he saw fit. The Immigration Act stated the Chairperson “is responsible for making such arrangements as are necessary or desirable to ensure the orderly and expeditious discharge of the functions of the Authority.”

The RSAA was governed by sections 129N – 129Z of the Immigration Amendment Act 1999. The two main functions were: “to hear appeals brought under section 129O from determinations by RSO’s not to recognise a claimant as a refugee”; and “to make determinations in relation to a person's refugee status on applications made by RSO’s under section 129L(1)(f)."

== Proceedings ==
For a claim to be successful, the claimant had to establish a "well-founded fear of persecution" by fulfilling the standard of proof. To determine whether this standard had been met, the RSAA had the powers of the Commission of Enquiry to verify facts and produce likely scenarios that may occur upon the claimant's return to their country of origin. These powers of enquiry were important considering the unique nature of the cases the body was dealing with. The RSAA interpreted ‘well-founded fear’ as meaning a ‘real chance’ that persecution would occur. This was to avoid formulating possibilities that may not eventuate. If the RSAA decided there was a real chance of persecution, they would then have to establish whether this fear was due to a reason outlined in the Refugee Convention. The second element of a successful claim was for the appellant to establish the onus of the claim. This was to prevent the decision-maker abusing the power of having the onus.

The RSAA operated according to the following principles:

- Gave the "benefit of doubt" to the claimant when facts or scenarios could not be determined.
- Maintained a low threshold for proving of a ‘real chance’ of persecution.
- Conducted proceedings in a non-adversarial manner.

== Relationship with the Refugee Convention and human rights ==
The RSAA had an interesting legal status. The Refugee Convention was not incorporated into New Zealand domestic law, but a framework was inserted in section 129A of the Immigration Act 1987 which emphasised full compliance with the Refugee Convention. This meant that the RSAA could completely focus on the convention, and also consider international jurisdictions and scholarship in their decisions. The RSAA used the good faith principle laid out in the article 31 Vienna Convention on the Law of Treaties to interpret the Refugee Convention. The RSAA also looked to international human rights treaties for guidance such as the Convention on the Elimination of All Forms of Discrimination against Women, the Convention on the Rights of the Child and the International Bill of Human Rights. Due to its ability to take all of these sources into account, the RSAA was praised for its clarity. This opened up an opportunity for the RSAA to make decisions that were significant internationally.

== Contribution to international refugee jurisprudence ==
=== Failure of state protection ===
A successful claimant must have shown that their state of origin had failed or will fail to prevent a real chance of persecution. In order to clear up this confusing area, the RSAA added four criteria, which Doug Tennant summarised as being:

1. Persecution committed by state concerned.
2. Persecution condoned by state concerned.
3. Persecution tolerated by state concerned.
4. Persecution not condoned or tolerated by state concerned, but present due to refusal or unable to offer protection.

These criteria put an emphasis on state failure to protect as opposed to the focusing on state complicity to persecution.

=== Member of a particular social group ===
One of the grounds for being a refugee is membership of a particular social group. The RSAA made numerous important decisions in this area. The RSAA decided to follow the approach in Ward to determine a particular social group by identifying crucial factors of an individual's identity or conscience. This is referred to as a “protected characteristic.” The RSAA made high-profile decisions concerning sexual orientation and gender discrimination as particular social groups for the purposes of the Refugee Convention.

==== Sexual orientation ====
In Refugee Appeal No 1312/93 the claimant had become a practicing homosexual since his arrival in New Zealand. He was originally from Iran and it was well established that homosexuality would be punished if he was sent back home. The RSAA had to decide whether having a certain sexual orientation constituted a membership of a particular social group. The RSAA held that homosexuality was a particular social group. The Authority was guided by writings by James C. Hathaway, the US Courts, the Supreme Court of Canada and human rights to come to this decision.

This approach towards sexual orientation was cited by the House of Lords in Islam Secretary of State for the Home Department and Regina v Immigration Appeal Tribunal + another ex parte Shah AP.

==== Gender discrimination ====
Both Refugee Appeal No 2039/93 and Refugee Appeal No 71427/99 held that in certain circumstances being a woman can amount to being a member of a particular social group. In Refugee Appeal No 2039/93 the claimant was not a virgin and if she was returned home and forced to marry, this could have potentially resulted in her death. The claimant in this case had also undergone a ‘self-awareness process’ that made her opposed to the oppression of women in Iranian society. In Refugee Appeal No 71427/99 the claimant had divorced her abusive husband and had rediscovered her child he had adopted out without her knowing. If she had been returned to Iran, she would have been subjected to death or imprisonment. In both of these cases the RSAA used human rights approaches to decide that in some cases being a woman constituted membership of a particular social group. Particular rights that were considered included: right to privacy, the right to life, freedom of thought, conscience and religion, the right not to be subjected to torture or cruel, inhuman or degrading treatment and punishment and right not to marry without full and free consent. The RSAA also took into account Iranian society and its tolerance of domestic violence and the denial to recognise women as human beings possessing the same status as men.

The gender discrimination cases were also ground-breaking because they established that persecution was "serious harm + failure of state protection". Both of these elements must be present for there to be refugee status. However, only one of these grounds needs to have a nexus with the Refugee Convention. For example, in Refugee Appeal No 71427/99 a link with the Refugee Convention could only be found with the failure of state protection. The RSAA held that a link with one of the constructs was sufficient for refugee status. This approach was followed by the Australian High Court in Khawar.

== High profile cases ==
=== Zaoui case ===
Zaoui’s case received a lot of media attention in New Zealand since it was the first time a New Zealand security risk certificate was awarded. When Zaoui first arrived in New Zealand, he claimed asylum following a military coup in Algeria. The Refugee Status Branch of the New Zealand Immigration Service, said there was a well-founded fear of persecution, but refugee status was denied due to evidence given by the Secret Intelligence Service (SIS) that indicated Zaoui's involvement in criminal and terrorist activity. On appeal to the RSAA, refugee status was awarded. However, the security risk certificate that was issued resulted in over two years in detention. In a Supreme Court decision, Zaoui was successful in being released from detention, indicating that a security risk certificate should not override a RSAA decision. In Zaoui v Attorney-General (No 2) the Supreme Court established that it was the role of the Minister of Immigration and not the Inspector-General to determine whether Zaoui was a threat that should be removed from New Zealand. The Zaoui case reached a conclusion in September 2007, when the SIS withdrew their objections and Zaoui was allowed to remain in New Zealand.

=== Refugee Appeal No. 76204 ===
This appeal case involved the third appeal of an Iranian claimant who had converted to Christianity. The first appeal was unsuccessful due to issues of credibility and the second appeal was unsuccessful due to his provision of false documentation. His case attracted media attention during his time in prison awaiting his deportation to Iran when he started religious fasting. The media attention meant that Iran became aware of the claimant's conversion, putting him in danger if he did return home. The RSAA decided the third appeal in the claimant's favour due to a well-founded fear of persecution on the grounds of religion.

=== Tamil X Case ===
The claimant was an engineer on a ship that was owned by Liberation Tigers of Tamil Eelam. The ship he was working on sank after it was fired upon by the Indian Navy. The claimant was charged with firing upon Indian Navy ships and was imprisoned in India for three years. Upon his release, he and his wife came to New Zealand claiming refugee status. The RSAA denied him refugee status due to his potential involvement in war crimes or crimes against humanity. At the Supreme Court of New Zealand, the court ruled that there was not enough evidence that the claimant had been involved in a war crime or crime against humanity to put him under the exclusion clause contained in article 1F of the Refugee Convention. His appeal was allowed, and case re-emitted to the RSAA.

== Replacement by the Immigration and Protection Tribunal ==
The RSAA was replaced by the Immigration and Protection Tribunal (IPT) on November 29, 2010. The IPT was established by section 217 of the Immigration Act 2009. The IPT subsumed four bodies that were formally, the Residence Review Board, Removal Review Authority, Refugee Status Appeals Authority and the Deportation Review Tribunal.
