= New Zealand permanent residency =

Immigration status

New Zealand permanent residents are residents of New Zealand who hold a residence class visa (including both resident visas and permanent resident visas). Both resident visas and permanent resident visas give the holders the permanent right to be in New Zealand. However, they have different travel conditions.

This article refers to the terms "resident" and "permanent resident" only in the scope of immigration purposes and describes the current situation based on the Immigration Act 2009. There are other definitions for residents in tax or electoral affairs.

== Similarities between a resident and a permanent resident visa ==
The holder of any residence class visa is entitled:

- to stay in New Zealand indefinitely
- to work in New Zealand or in the exclusive economic zone of New Zealand
- to study in New Zealand
- to receive free or subsidised health care at publicly funded health services.
- to free education at state-run primary and secondary schools, and subsidised fees for domestic students at private schools and tertiary institutions.
- to enrol and vote in elections (after one year of residence).
- to receive a social security benefit (after two years' residence for Jobseeker Support, Sole Parent Support and Supported Living Payment; after ten years' residence for New Zealand Superannuation; varies for other benefits).
- to sponsor a partner, parents or dependent children during their visa application

== Differences between a resident and a permanent resident visa ==
A permanent resident visa holder is entitled to be granted entry permission at the border at any time, while the resident visa holder is only entitled to apply for entry permission (whether before or after travelling to New Zealand). All other rights become effective only if entry is granted to the resident visa holder.

Generally, a resident visa is granted with travel conditions, which allow the holder to re-enter the country multiple times until these conditions expire. After that the holder may remain in the country legally but must not leave it or lose their resident visa.

== Requirements to obtain a permanent resident visa ==
An applicant for a permanent resident visa must

- hold or have held a resident visa in the last three months
- hold, or have held that resident visa for at least two years continuously
- be of good character
- have met any conditions that the resident visa was subject to

Commitment to New Zealand can be met by spending enough time in the country, by becoming a tax resident, by owning a business, by investing in New Zealand or by establishing a base.

== Differences between a permanent resident and New Zealand citizen ==
In contrast to a New Zealand permanent resident, a New Zealand citizen

- is entitled to hold and travel on a New Zealand passport
- must never be deported from New Zealand
- can stand for public office
- does not need a visa for their return to New Zealand
- is entitled to New Zealand consular protection
- may represent New Zealand at international sport events
- is entitled to live and work in Australia indefinitely
- transmits their citizenship to their children
- may be a celebrant, a person who perform weddings or civil unions, in New Zealand

== Pathways to a permanent resident visa ==
The way to a permanent resident visa almost always leads through a two-year resident visa. In any case you will need to be invited to apply for a resident visa by Immigration New Zealand. Currently there are the following categories through one can obtain a resident visa:

- Skilled Migrant Category (for skilled professional people)
- Residence from Work Category (for people who have worked for 2 years on a Work to Residence Category work visa)
- Business Category (for people who want to start their own business)
- Investment Category (for people who want to invest a large amount of funds in New Zealand)
- Family Category (for partners, children or parents of New Zealand citizens or resident visa holders)
- Samoan Quota Category (for Samoan Citizens)
- Pacific Access Quota (for citizens of Fiji, Tonga, Tuvalu or Kiribati)

== Australian citizens and permanent residents ==
Australian citizens and Australian permanent residents can enter New Zealand and live in New Zealand indefinitely without a visa, provided they meet the health and character requirements. They are assumed to hold a New Zealand resident visa while in New Zealand with a few key differences:

- Australian citizens and permanent residents who have lived in New Zealand for less than two years are not entitled to subsidised GP visits or ambulance costs (except where covered by ACC).
- Australian citizens and permanent residents can count their time resident in Australia towards certain social security benefits, namely New Zealand Superannuation, Veteran's Pension and Supported Living Payment.

== See also ==
- Trans-Tasman Travel Arrangement – Australian arrivals to New Zealand
- Immigration New Zealand
