= Refugees As Survivors New Zealand =

Charity in New Zealand

Refugees As Survivors New Zealand (RASNZ) is the charitable humanitarian NGO which is the lead agency for mental health services for all incoming UNHCR quota and convention refugees who enter New Zealand for resettlement. Established in 1997, RASNZ is based at the national refugee reception centre at Māngere in Auckland. Working closely with Immigration New Zealand (INZ) and other government agencies at the centre, RASNZ provides treatment for traumatised refugees and victims of torture. Initially treatment and support is provided at the Māngere Refugee Resettlement Centre. As of 2024, New Zealand accepts 1500 UN refugees per year as part of its international quota resettlement programme.
