= Skilled Migrant Category (New Zealand) =

Immigration designation

The Skilled Migrant Category (SMC) is the way skilled migrants qualify to gain a New Zealand resident visa and, subsequently, Permanent Residence (PR) to New Zealand. It is managed by Immigration New Zealand under the Immigration Act 2009.

The current SMC commenced on 9th October 2023, replacing the previous SMC which suffered from lengthy processing delays prior to the COVID-19 pandemic, with Immigration New Zealand figures reportedly showing unprocessed skilled migrant applications jumping from 8,000 to 19,000 in the year to August 2019. Processing of SMC applications was halted during the COVID-19 pandemic. In August 2021, the government announced the introduction of a ‘one-off’ 2021 Resident Visa, which remained open for 12 months and drastically reduced the number of unprocessed SMC applications as people switched to applying under the 2021 Resident Visa category instead. During September and October 2022, Immigration New Zealand announced a number of new, skills-based residence visas, including the current SMC.

The current SMC implements a number of efficiencies to the old SMC, including a simplified points system and the removal of pool selections.

The last date for lodging an expression of interest under the previous SMC was 15 August 2023, and applications under that old category have continued to be assessed after the current SMC’s commencement.

== Introduction ==
The SMC combines both a points-based system as well as minimum requirements. The minimum points required is 6, and other minimum requirements include that one holds current skilled employment or an offer of skilled employment with a New Zealand employer that holds an accreditation with Immigration New Zealand, be aged 55 or under, be healthy, be of good character, and meet minimum English language requirements.

== The Points system ==
Under the SMC, points are allocated for income, qualification, New Zealand licensing, certification or registration, and work experience gained in New Zealand.

Applicants may claim between 3 – 6 points for either their income (based on the New Zealand median wage published from time to time) or their qualification or their licensing, certification or registration in New Zealand. Additionally, they may claim between 1 - 3 points for skilled work experience gained in New Zealand.

=== Income ===
For income, a person can claim 6 points for income that is three times the New Zealand median wage, 4 points for income that is twice the New Zealand median wage, or 3 points for income that is 1.5 times the New Zealand median wage.

=== Qualifications ===
For qualifications, a person can claim 6 points for a Level 10 Doctoral Degree, 5 points for a Level 9 Master's Degree, 4 points for a Level 8 Bachelor's Honours Degree or Postgraduate Diploma, or 3 points for a Level 8 Postgraduate Certificate or Level 7 Bachelor's Degree. Foreign qualifications must be verified by the New Zealand Qualifications Authority before points can be claimed, and this process can take several months.

=== Licensing, certification or registration ===
For licensing, certification or registration in New Zealand, a person can claim between 3 – 6 points depending on the type of registration, license, or certification, which must be listed in Immigration New Zealand’s Operational Manual, which defines the requirements and number of points awarded for each.

=== Skilled work experience gained in New Zealand ===
In addition to claiming points for either income or qualification or New Zealand licensing, certification or registration, a person may claim between 1 - 3 additional points for skilled work experience gained in New Zealand. 6 points can be claimed for three years’ skilled work experience gained in New Zealand within the previous five years, 5 points can be claimed for two years’ skilled work experience gained in New Zealand within the previous four years, and 4 points can be claimed for one year of skilled work experience gained in New Zealand within the previous two years.

However, Immigration New Zealand only recognises skilled work experience gained in New Zealand if it is full-time employment (at least 30 guaranteed hours per week for every week worked) and the person has been paid:

- at least the median wage if their occupation is listed at Australian and New Zealand Standard Classification of Occupations (ANZSCO) skill level 1-3; or
- 1.5 times the median wage if their occupation is either listed at ANZSCO skill level 4-5 or not included in ANZSCO; or
- If they have claimed points for their income, the level of income at which they claimed those points (e.g., 1.5 times the median wage, twice the median wage, or three times the median wage).

Immigration New Zealand’s Operational Manual sets out a number of rules to take into account regular changes to New Zealand’s median wage during the period any skilled work experience is claimed, including if a person changes jobs.

=== Skilled Employment or Offer of Skilled Employment ===
In addition to claiming 6 points and meeting age, English language, health and character requirements, a person must either have current full-time employment or an offer of full-time employment in New Zealand that pays at least the equivalent of:

- the New Zealand median wage if their occupation is listed at ANZSCO skill level 1-3; or
- 1.5 times the New Zealand median wage if their occupation is listed at ANZSCO skill level 4-5 or is not included in the ANZSCO.

Additionally, the employer must hold an accreditation with Immigration New Zealand.

== The Selection Process ==
The two stage process commences with lodging an Expression of Interest online form. There is no fee for this stage. ^{A}n automated electronic system determines whether the person meets the requirements to be invited to apply under the Skilled Migrant Category.

If a person meets the requirements, they are notified by mail and invited to apply online, they are required to upload their documentation and evidence to their online application and lodge their application with Immigration New Zealand. The documentation which must be uploaded includes identity documents (e.g. passport, passport sized photograph, birth certificate, police certificates, medicals), evidence of skilled employment or an offer of skilled employment, evidence of meeting English language requirements, and evidence in respect of the claimed 6 points. The Immigration New Zealand application fee (currently NZD 4,290) must also be paid at this stage.

Applications must be lodged within 4 months, otherwise the invitation lapses. The current processing times for SMC applications are approximately 4 months.

Partners and dependent children may be included as secondary applicants in the Expression of Interest and SMC application.
