= New Zealand diaspora =

New Zealand emigrants and their descendants

The New Zealand diaspora is the group of people living outside of New Zealand whose ancestors migrated from New Zealand.

New Zealanders generally migrate to other OECD countries, with about 600,000 diaspora members in OECD countries in 2015, constituting 13.5% of New Zealand's national population; in particular, New Zealanders often go to Australia because of the similarities, geographical closeness, and friendly institutional arrangements between the two nations.

In the past, the diaspora was seen in a negative light by the New Zealand government; at the turn of the 21st century, however, increasingly neoliberal policies led to the diaspora being seen as an asset of New Zealand.

== See also ==
- Overseas experience
- Expatriate Party of New Zealand
