= Human Relief Foundation =

British charitable organization

- Founded: 1991
- Purpose: Education, Health, Orphans, Water, Emergency Relief.
- Location: Bradford, England
- Origins: Manchester, England
- Income: £6.5 Million (2017)
- Disbursements: £4.58 Million (2017)
- Expenses: £1.3 Million (2017)
- Website: www.hrf.org.uk

Human Relief Foundation (HRF) is a charity established in the United Kingdom in response to the Gulf War in 1991.

Following the 2003 Iraq war, HRF provided training courses for doctors and sent a considerable number of medical staff from the UK to help train the Iraqi doctors.

HRF responds to emergency situations by providing aid in different parts of the world. HRF was one of the charities in the UK which participated in raising up to £500,000 in response to the earthquake in Sri Lanka in 2004.

HRF works to improve the living standards of people who are in need through a number of development programmes, with the director of HRF Nabeel Ramadhani stating that HRF has helped Palestinian refugees in Lebanon and Jordan.
