= Security risk certificate =

A security risk certificate is part of a New Zealand legal process whereby a person suspected of being a security risk can be incarcerated prior to expulsion from the country.

The security risk certificate is based on unchallengeable "classified security information". This is information that, in the opinion of the Director of the New Zealand Security Intelligence Service "cannot be divulged to the individual in question or to other persons" for various reasons, including those listed below.

== Reasons for non-disclosure ==
Disclosure may, for example:

- "lead to the identification of, or provide details of, the source of the information, the nature, content, or scope of the information, or the nature or type of the assistance or operational methods available to the New Zealand Security Intelligence Service"
- be "about particular operations that have been undertaken, or are being or are proposed to be undertaken, in pursuance of any of the functions of the Service or of another intelligence and security agency"
- have "been provided to the New Zealand Security Intelligence Service by the government of any other country or by an agency of such a government, and is information that cannot be disclosed by the Service because the government or agency by which that information has been provided will not consent to the disclosure"
- "prejudice the security or defence of New Zealand or the international relations of the Government of New Zealand" or
- "prejudice the entrusting of information to the Government of New Zealand on a basis of confidence by the government of another country or any agency of such a government, or by any international organisation".

== Appeals ==
=== To the Inspector-General of Intelligence and Security ===
The sole avenue for appeal against a certificate is the Inspector-General of Intelligence and Security. It is the role of the Inspector-General to determine whether the certificate was properly issued. This is not, properly speaking, an appeal or rehearing. The Inspector-General has privileged access to classified security information, significant powers, and wide discretion as to how to use them (they are acting, however, in a quasi-judicial capacity). The position of the Inspector-General was created in conjunction with the 1996 amendment to the New Zealand Security Intelligence Service Act.

The Inspector-General of Intelligence and Security, a retired High Court judge, is required to review the security risk certificate.

Although the Immigration Act allows both the Inspector-General and the minister to consider information other than the classified information signified by the security risk certificate, it does not explicitly provide for the fair and transparent procedures required by international human rights standards.

=== To the Court of Appeal ===
There is a right of appeal to the Court of Appeal against a decision of the Inspector-General which confirms the certificate, on the ground that the decision is "erroneous in point of law".

== Example ==
Most famously Algerian refugee Ahmed Zaoui was incarcerated in a maximum-security prison in solitary confinement on the strength of a report produced by the threat assessment unit of the police.

On 20 March 2003 a security risk certificate was issued by the Director of Security under Part 4A of the Immigration Act that allows for "persons .... who pose a security risk … where necessary [to] be effectively and quickly detained and removed or deported from New Zealand" on the basis of classified security information provided by the New Zealand Security Intelligence Service.

== Designation of an entity ==
A comparable procedure to the current system for review of a security risk certificate is that provided for the designation of an entity as a terrorist entity or an associated entity of a terrorist by the Prime Minister under the Terrorism Suppression Act 2002.

Under s 38 a marked departure occurs from New Zealand's open justice and adversarial process in procedures relating to such applications to challenge or to appeal such designation.

The Chief Justice or nominee, on request by the Attorney-General, if satisfied that it is desirable to do so for the protection of the classified information received or hear the classified security information in the absence of the designated entity, and all barristers and solicitors representing that entity, and all members of the public. A summary of the information, excluding any summary of information that will itself likely to prejudice the interests set out in s 32(3), is then approved by the court. A copy of that would then be given to the entity concerned.

Section 32(3) is denied if the disclosure would be likely:

- To prejudice the security or defence of New Zealand, or the international relations of the Government of New Zealand; or
- To prejudice the entrusting of information to the government … by the government of another country or international organisation; or
- To prejudice making of law including the prevention, investigation and detection of offences and the right to a fair trial; or
- To endanger the safety of any person.

While the specific offences of terrorist bombing and financing of terrorism offences do not rely on the designation of entities, the other prohibition offences do, unless the prosecution can rely upon knowledge/recklessness of the group carrying out a terrorist act. The other offence (relating to dealings with terrorists) is also affected by extraterritorial jurisdiction either as to the actus reus or to some aspect of connection with the offence or offenders.

== Classified information ==
The procedure for dealing with classified information with respect to the Terrorism Suppression Act 2002 is slightly more open than that which governs security risk certificates under the Immigration Act 1987, in that there is a presumption that a summary of information will be made available to the applicant. The counsel are ordinary defence counsel, and lack access to the classified material.

== See also ==
- Security certificate – a similar mechanism in Canada
