= Immigration New Zealand =

Government agency

- Te Ratonga Manene (Māori)

Agency overview
- Formed: 1912
- Ministers responsible: Hon Erica Stanford, Minister of Immigration; Hon Chris Penk, Associate Minister of Immigration
- Parent department: Ministry of Business, Innovation and Employment
- Website: www.immigration.govt.nz

Immigration New Zealand (INZ; Māori: Te Ratonga Manene), formerly the New Zealand Immigration Service (NZIS), is the agency within the New Zealand Ministry of Business, Innovation and Employment (MBIE) that is responsible for border control, issuing travel visas and managing immigration to New Zealand.

== History ==
=== Immigration Department, 1909–1946 ===
Immigration New Zealand's origins can be traced back to an informal "Immigration Department" that was established within the Lands and Survey Department in 1909. The Immigration Department was tasked with finding employment for new immigrants. In response to demand for more workers in the manufacturing sector, Prime Minister William Massey announced the formation of an official Immigration Department in 1912. This Immigration Department initially had six staff and was headed by J.E. Smith. This Department assumed the immigration functions of the Public Works and Lands and Survey Departments. However, the First World War prevented a large-scale assisted programme to New Zealand. In 1931, the Immigration Department and the Department of Labour were merged into a combined "Department of Labour and Immigration."

=== Immigration Division, 1946–1988 ===
By 1946, the Department of Labour's immigration function had been transferred to a newly-created "Immigration Division" headed by Jack Brennan. This Immigration Division was tasked with administering New Zealand's post-war assisted immigration scheme and came under the oversight of a newly-created Immigration ministerial portfolio. Following the Second World War, the Secretary of Labour Herbert Leslie Bockett expanded the Immigration Division by establishing sections in Auckland, Wellington, Christchurch, and Dunedin district offices. A Migration Office was also opened in London opposite the New Zealand High Commission in London. The Department of Labour used advertisement and booklets to encourage European immigration to New Zealand during the post-World War II boom.

In 1971, the Immigration Division cooperated with the-then Ministry of Foreign Affairs to expand immigration to Asians with professional and technical qualifications, English language skills, and specific jobs. By 1975, rising unemployment led the New Zealand government to end its assisted migration scheme for migrants. Under the leadership of Assistant Secretary J.L Fouhy, the Immigration Division was tasked with enforcing the Immigration Act 1964. During the 1970s and early 1980s, the Immigration Division and Department of Labour was tasked with managing various issues including Pacific Islander overstayers and refugees from Vietnam and Cambodia. In response, the Department of Labour established a work permit scheme for Tongan, Fijian and Samoan migrants in 1975. The Immigration Division also established a resettlement unit to manage the resettlement of Indochinese refugees in New Zealand. By 1985, more than 6,000 Vietnamese and Cambodian refugees had settled in New Zealand. By 1984, the Department of Labour's Immigration Division had 157 staff.

=== Immigration Service, 1988–2004 ===
Following a review of the Department of Labour in 1988, the Immigration Division was revamped as the "Immigration Service." The Immigration Service established three regional and four branch offices. Staff numbers rose from 139 to 324 by 1992. By the early 1990s, Asia and the Pacific Islands had replaced the United Kingdom and Europe as the main source of New Zealand's immigration. In 1993, the Immigration Service was reorganized to accommodate the increased number of tourists and to shift much of the immigrant processing to staff overseas. In response to the increasing strain placed by immigration on New Zealand's social infrastructure particularly housing and education, the Department of Labour tightened English language and capital requirements.

=== Immigration NZ, 2004–present ===
In 2004, Immigration New Zealand was designated as the government agency in charge of migration settlement. In 2005, the Fifth Labour Government established the Pacific Division to improve visa and immigration services in the Pacific Islands and for Pasifika peoples living in New Zealand. In 2009, a report by the Controller and Auditor-General identified a range of problems including poor leadership, mismanagement, lack of accountability and transparency, poor services, and a "fiefdom" mentality. In response to the report, the Fifth National Government dissolved the Pacific Division and re-integrated it into INZ.

After the Department of Labour was merged into the Ministry of Business, Innovation and Employment (MBIE) in July 2012, Immigration New Zealand was incorporated into the new ministry.

== Functions and structure ==
Immigration New Zealand is an agency within the Ministry of Business, Innovation and Employment that is responsible for facilitating and regulating immigration, tourism, foreign students and workers, and foreign investment in New Zealand. Immigration NZ's other responsibilities include migrant attraction, visa facilitation, border protection and refugee resettlement. As of 2017, the division has five branches:

- Compliance, Risk and Intelligence
- Visa Services, which provides immigration advice, services, and visa application processing.
- Service Design and Performance
- Settlement, Protection and Attraction
- Vision 2015, an initiative implemented in 2012 to upgrade INZ's information and communications technology.

=== Oversight ===
Administratively, Immigration NZ is headed by Deputy Secretary Alison McDonald. Politically, the agency comes under the portfolio of the Minister of Immigration, which was created in 1946. Immigration NZ provides the Minister of Immigration with operational support while MBIE's Immigration Policy Team advises the Minister on policy matters. Immigration NZ and the Minister of Immigration are also regulated by the Immigration Act 2009. As of 2022, the current Minister is Erica Stanford.

=== Offices and facilities ===
Immigration New Zealand maintains eight offices in New Zealand. INZ maintains offices in Auckland Central, Henderson, Manukau, Hamilton, Palmerston North, Wellington's Te Aro suburb, Porirua and Christchurch. In November 2017, the agency's general manager Steve Stuart announced that it would consider shutting down its Auckland Central and Henderson offices due to increased public usage of its websites and online visa application platforms.

Immigration New Zealand's Visa Services group also operated seventeen Visa Application Centres in Suva, Nuku'alofa, Apia, Bangkok, Jakarta, Manila, Ho Chi Minh City, Hong Kong, Shanghai, Beijing, New Delhi, Mumbai, Dubai, Pretoria, London, Moscow, and Washington, DC. In November 2017, it was announced that Immigration New Zealand would close down 12 of its existing 17 overseas offices as part of a policy to shift visa processing back to New Zealand. Affected offices included those in Ho Chi Minh City, Hong Kong, Jakarta, Bangkok, Moscow, New Delhi, Pretoria and Shanghai. While the offices in Manila, Washington, DC, London and Dubai would cease processing visas, it was decided that they would remain open in order to gather market intelligence, carry out verification activities and maintain relationships with key partner countries.

In September 2018, Immigration New Zealand embarked on a NZ$25.2 million restructuring plan that led to the closure of six offices in Hong Kong, Ho Chi Minh City, Moscow, Jakarta, Shanghai, and New Delhi. The Dubai, Pretoria, Bangkok, Washington DC, London, and Manila offices remain open but have ceased processing visas. However, visa processing centres in Beijing, Mumbai, and the Pacific Islands will remain open. Immigration NZ also announced the retrenchment of 380 roles and the relocation of 121 staff from their Auckland Central and Henderson offices to Manukau.

=== Refugee resettlement ===
In addition, Immigration New Zealand also manages the Mangere Refugee Resettlement Centre, which provides English language orientation classes, health screening, and mental health support for refugees who enter New Zealand under the Refugee Quota Programme. In 2016, the Centre was reopened after undergoing extensive renovation.

In 1987, the New Zealand Government established a formal annual quota for refugees. Under the Refugee Quota Programme, New Zealand takes in 750 refugees annually. Immigration NZ's Refugee Quota Branch (RQB) is charged with running the Refugee Quota Programme. In response to the Syrian Civil War, the New Zealand Government announced in September 2015 that the country would be taking in 600 Syrian refugees under an emergency quota as well as 150 within the normal quota.

=== Visas ===
Visas are issued by INZ staff in offices throughout New Zealand and around the world. Visa Services is the group within Immigration New Zealand responsible for providing immigration advice, services, and visa application services. Until June 2012, visas were issued by the Ministry of Foreign Affairs and Trade's embassy and high commission network. After June 2012, third-part providers (visa application centres) received and lodged visa applications submitted outside New Zealand. These visa application centers allowed Immigration New Zealand to share resources with its Five Country Conference partners: Australia, Canada, the United States, and the United Kingdom.

Under the Immigration Act 2009, a visa is an authority for an individual to travel to, or stay in New Zealand (under the Immigration Act 1987 a visa only allowed you to travel to New Zealand and a permit allowed you to stay). A visa has conditions that indicate what the holder of the visa may do.

Immigration New Zealand issues four main types of visas:

- Visitor Visas, which allow a person to stay in New Zealand for a period of time to visit or for short-term study.
- Student Visas, which allow a person to study full-time in New Zealand.
- Work Visas, which allow a person to work part-time or full-time in New Zealand
- Residence visas, which allow a person to study, work, and live permanently in New Zealand.

Because of understaffing turnaround times to process visa application have steadily increased over the years. Currently INZ expects to process visa applications within 60 working days after an application is lodged. According to INZ, processing a residence application usually takes 6 to 9 months, while endorsing a passport with Residence Permits and Returning Resident's Visa after 'approval in principle' has been granted takes up to 30 working days.

In August 2024, Immigration NZ announced plans to raise fees for a range of visitor, work, student and migrant visas from 1 October 2024 in line with the Sixth National Government's policy of shifting the visa processing system towards a "user-pay system."

== Public profile and controversies ==
=== Staff misconduct ===
In February 2004, Immigration Officer Manjit Singh was charged for theft for pocketing the proceeds of disposing of the assets of nationals deported from New Zealand.

In 2009, The Christchurch and Sydney branches were revealed to have operated an unsanctioned "initiative" called "Project Crusade" between April and July 2008 in granting visas to applicants who had not submitted either medicals or police clearance certificates. It was halted following a review by the Department of Labour in 2009.

In 2012, it was reported that 50 Immigration NZ staff had improperly accessed client information since the agency started its internal investigation process in 2004.

=== Bunnygate ===
Lianne Dalziel, resigned as Minister for Immigration on 20 February 2004 for leaking and later lying about leaking it to the Media a copy of a legally privileged letter from a Sri Lankan asylum seeker, a scandal that was later referred to as Bunnygate.

=== Pacific Division scandals ===
In 2008, Mary-Anne Thompson, the General Manager of the Pacific Division, was forced to resign after two scandals. The first scandal was where she was exposed as not only getting several relatives from Kiribati to NZ without a visa in full violation of immigration rules, but later obtaining them Permanent Residency under an annual quota. Despite the fact that they had not been even randomly selected out of the lottery like every one else, their residency applications were processed. Despite these repeated and blatant breaches of policy, the initial internal investigation merely recommended "counseling". Her second scandal was where she was subsequently exposed at lying about her qualifications, namely her claim to have a doctorate from the London School of Economics, a claim later exposed to be untrue. She subsequently pleaded guilty to criminal charges laid regarding this claim.

At the same time of that scandal hit the headlines, it was also revealed that Thompson had awarded a $500,000 untendered contract to set up the Pacific Branch to Pacific Edge International Limited, despite it being owned directed by senior Immigration Manager Kerupi Tavita, which when challenged the involvement of Tavita, simply bypassed this by resigning his directorship, and got his wife to substitute for him. Later, the other director, Mai Malaulau, was controversially appointed the head of the Pacific Branch.

In March 2009, Immigration NZ's Pacific Division was dissolved by the Fifth National Government following a damning report which identified a range of problems including poor leadership, mismanagement, lack of accountability and transparency, poor services, and a "fiefdom" mentality.

=== Restructuring ===
In November 2017, Immigration New Zealand's efforts to close down several domestic branch offices in favour of shifting services online drew criticism from representatives of the Pacific communities in New Zealand including Member of Parliament William Sio. Key complaints were that many Tongan and Pacific New Zealanders lacked access to computer and that delays in renewing immigration applications had caused some people to be classified as overstayers. Peter Elms, the Immigration NZ's director of operations for visa services, defended the Department's decision to shift services online and contended that clients could still contact INZ officials via phone.

=== Karel Sroubek controversy ===
In November 2018, drug smuggler and convicted Czech criminal Karel Sroubek was granted residency by Minister of Immigration Ian Lees-Galloway.

The controversy arose when in 2018, despite being in prison for smuggling MDMA, Sroubek's residency wasn't revoked, and he was granted a further visa by the then Immigration Minister, Iain Lees-Galloway. This decision drew criticism due to Sroubek's criminal activities, both in New Zealand and the Czech Republic. In response to public outcry, the Minister reviewed the case. In November 2018, following the review, Lees-Galloway reversed the decision, stating new information had come to light which contradicted the information considered in the original decision. Sroubek's residency was contingent on the fact that he could not return to the Czech Republic due to fears for his safety, but the new information suggested that he had returned on his own volition.

=== Israel-Palestine map ===
In mid–June 2019, Immigration New Zealand attracted criticism from the pro-Israel advocacy group Israel Institute of New Zealand after it published a map on its website which labeled Israel as Palestine. An Immigration NZ spokesperson clarified that the map had been published as part of its online fact sheets on the humanitarian situation in Palestine and New Zealand's refugee program. The Israel Institute's Director Ashley Church demanded that the Immigration Minister apologize to the Jewish community and confirm this did not represent New Zealand foreign policy. He also demanded that Immigration NZ issue an apology and take steps to prevent such incidents from recurring in the future.

On 20 June, the Immigration Minister Iain Lees-Galloway issued an apology to the Israeli Ambassador Itzhak Gerberg and said that immediate action had been taken to remove the diagram. Deputy Prime Minister Winston Peters described the map as a "careless and shoddy mistake" and criticized the handling of the incident as "an affront to the Israeli people."

=== NRI partnership visas ===
In mid October 2019, Immigration New Zealand controversially tightened their partnership visa policies to exclude applicants from India who were engaged in non-resident Indian (NRI) marriages. Since 2009, the New Zealand Government had made an exception for NRI messages at the advice of the Ombudsman. This ruling was criticized by the Indian community as racist. In early November 2019, the Government announced the reversal of the partnership visa decision, restoring the exception for non-resident Indian marriages.

=== Suspension of Afghan visas ===
In early November 2021, Community Law Waikato challenged Immigration New Zealand's decision to stop processing visas by Afghan migrants and refugees in 2020 due to COVID-19 border restrictions. Crown lawyer Robert Kirkness defended the department's decision, citing New Zealand's COVID-19 border restrictions. On 23 November, the High Court ruled that Immigration NZ was wrong to stop processing the Afghan interpreters' visa applications due to COVID-19 and not making an exception on humanitarian grounds in light of the 2021 Taliban offensive.

In late November 2021, Immigration NZ defied the High Court's ruling and issued a new ruling suspending the processing of Afghan visa applications, claiming that an external humanitarian crisis was not relevant to the determination of a travel request to travel to New Zealand. Following a judicial challenge by Community Law Waikato, the High Court ruled that the government department was wrong to halt processing Afghan visas due to COVID-19. However, travel plans for prospective Afghan migrants were hindered by the planned suspension of emergency flights organised by the Ministry of Foreign Affairs and Trade (MFAT) over the 2021–2022 summer season.

In early February 2022, Radio New Zealand reported that only 17 of the 77 Afghan applicants had received a Family Support Category visa since November 2021. These 17 individuals were unable to enter the country due to a lack of official assistance from MFAT, which claimed that these applicants did not meet the criteria of people who had helped NZ agencies in Afghanistan and their immediate family members. Immigration New Zealand had initially assigned two staff members to process their visas following the court ruling but subsequently assigned nine personnel to processing Afghan visas. Community Law CEO Sue Moroney criticised the Government for preventing Afghan applicants from resettling in New Zealand.

=== Dawn raids ===
On 2 May 2023, Immigration New Zealand confirmed that it had visited 623 visa overstayers in the period between July 2022 and April 2023. While the vast majority of these visits were carried out between 7am and 9pm, the agency acknowledged that it had conducted 18-19 visits (roughly 3%) "outside of hours" including dawn. According to Immigration Minister Michael Wood's office, these 19 cases consisted of 10 Chinese, four Indians, two Tongans, one Samoan, one Malaysian and one Indonesian. This acknowledgement came in response to media coverage of a joint Immigration-Police "dawn raid" conducted against a Pasifika overstayer between 5am and 6am in late April. During the raid, immigration officials and Police had surrounded the exits of the overstayer's rental property, traumatising his wife and young children. The father was subsequently taken to Manukau police station. Immigration New Zealand stated that it was rare for the department to conduct early morning operations and that this operation had been approved by the national manager of compliance.

In response to the raid, Prime Minister Chris Hipkins confirmed that Associate Immigration Minister Rachel Brooking was investigating the Pasifika overstayer's case. In addition, Immigration Minister Wood sent a letter of expectations to Immigration NZ's chief executive emphasising the Government's expectation that deportations should only occur in extreme cases and that the agency's operational policy should reflect the Government's 2021 apology for the 1970s dawn raids. Deputy Prime Minister Carmel Sepuloni, the first Pasifika office holder in that role, criticised Immigration NZ for "re-traumatising" the Pasifika community and reiterated that raids should only be carried in cases of threats to public security.

The April raid was also criticised by the Pasifika overstayer's lawyer Soane Foliaki former Polynesian Panther Tigilau Ness, lawyer Soane Foliaki, Green Party co-leader Marama Davidson, and ACT Party leader David Seymour for traumatising the overstayer's family and evoking memories of the controversial dawn raids of the 1970s which disproportionately targeted Pasifika New Zealanders. The Green Party also reiterated its calls for an amnesty for overstayers. While National Party leader Christopher Luxon acknowledged the historical sensitivity around the dawn raids, he argued that Immigration New Zealand needed to "reserve the option" to use dawn raids against individuals involved in serious criminal offending or who posed a security risk to New Zealand.

In late May 2023, a Chinese overstayer known by the alias "Chen" (or "Feng") and his lawyer Tuariki Delamere claimed that Immigration compliance officers and the Police used "unnecessary force" when arresting Chen during a raid on six Chinese and Malaysian overstayers sharing a flat in 2022. Chen claimed that he had mistaken the Immigration compliance officers and Police for robbers since he and none of his flatmates spoke English. Chen had jumped over a balcony railing on the second floor. Chen says that he was tackled by several Immigration compliance officers and sustained a broken left wrist. Delamere complained about Chen's treatment to the Police, Independent Police Conduct Authority and MBIE. Immigration NZ disputed Chen's version of events and claimed that Chen had jumped off the deck, moved his left arm in an attempt to break his fall, and physically resisted Immigration compliance officers. Delamere disputed Immigration NZ's account of events. In addition to overstaying his visa, Chen was also charged with being linked to an organised fraud group that was involved in organising travel plans and visa applications. Chen disputed the charges and unsuccessfully applied for refugee status with Immigration NZ's Refugee Protection Unit in February 2023, claiming that he risked arrest if deported to China. Chen subsequently appealed the Protection Unit's decision to the Immigration Protection Tribunal.

On 10 July 2023, senior lawyer Mike Heron released his independent review into Immigration NZ's "out of hours immigration visits." His review found that Immigration NZ, MBIE, and the Immigration Minister had made no changes to their compliance visits and other immigration practices despite the 2021 apology. Heron also found that contemporary "out of hours" compliance visits mainly targeted Chinese and Indian nationals, with few Pasifika being affected. Heron's review made five recommendations including amending the Immigration Act 2009 to specify the criteria for "out of hours" compliances visits; treating "out of hours" compliance visits as a last resort; considering their impact on children, the elderly, and other vulnerable individuals; assessing the reasonableness, proportionality, and public interest of these visits; and that any compliance visits be authorised by the relevant compliance manager and national manager. Immigration Minister Andrew Little apologised that the Government had not updated its guidance on dawn raid policies following the national apology. Little said he would discuss the Heron review's recommendations with Cabinet.

=== Accredited employer scheme ===
In September 2023, Steve Watson, Immigration NZ's general manager of immigration compliance and investigations, confirmed it had received 711 complaints against accredited employers and was investigating 154 accredited employers for criminal offending including misleading advertising and exploitation of migrant workers. Watson also confirmed that 151 of these complaints had been referred to Immigration NZ's compliance department since they concerned migrants working in breach of their visa conditions while 406 had been referred to Employment New Zealand since they involved breaches of employment law and migrant exploitation. Between May and September 2023, The New Zealand Herald had reported that hundreds of Nepalese, South American, Bangladeshi, Indian, and Pakistani migrants had been scammed by several accredited employers into paying large amounts of money for work visas for non-existent jobs or jobs that did not match job advertisements. Many of these migrants were unable to find work, income, or safe housing in New Zealand. In response to media coverage, the National Party's immigration spokesperson Erica Stanford described the migrant exploitation situation as "the worst human suffering we have seen in this country, maybe ever" and blamed it on the lowering of checks on employers by the Government.

=== 2026 biometric upgrade misspending ===
In June 2026, Immigration New Zealand and its parent organisation MBIE drew criticism from Minister of Immigration Erica Stanford for misleading government ministers and Parliament about a failed NZ$33 million Immigration Biometric Upgrade project between November 2018 and November 2025. MBIE and Immigration NZ officials were also accused of using "creative accounting" to conceal the cost and progress of the project from Cabinet oversight. In response, the Public Service Commission and MBIE launched separate investigations into the Immigration Biometric Upgrade Project and another similar IT upgrade project called "Our Future Services." In late August 2026, the New Zealand Parliament's Privileges Committee censured both Immigration NZ head Alison McDonald and MBIE's chief executive Nick Blakeley for not earlier disclosing in March 2026 that the biometric upgrade project had already been cancelled. By late September 2026, Blakely acknowledged that MBIE and Immigration NZ had spent NZ$50.7 million in taxpayer funds on the failed biometric upgrade project.

== See also ==
- Immigration and Protection Tribunal
- Minister of Immigration (New Zealand)
- New Zealand Customs Service
- Visa policy of New Zealand
