= Ahmed Zaoui =

Algerian politician

Ahmed Zaoui أحمد الزاوي
- Born: November 26, 1961 (age 64); El Idrissia, Algeria
- Citizenship: Algeria; New Zealand
- Education: Imam Mohammad Ibn Saud Islamic University (BA)

Ahmed Zaoui (Arabic: أحمد الزاوي; born 26 November 1961) is an Algerian refugee. He arrived in New Zealand on 4 December 2002 where he sought refugee status. Objections from the Security Intelligence Service were withdrawn in September 2007, allowing him to remain in New Zealand. He was granted New Zealand citizenship in 2014.

== Background ==
=== Before 1991 ===
Ahmed Zaoui was born as one of ten children in El Idrissia, in Djelfa Wilaya, Algeria, and was the son of a Sunni Muslim imam. His family moved to the town of Médéa when he was young, and after completing high school, he enrolled in Imam Muhammad Ibn Saud Islamic University, in Riyadh, Saudi Arabia between the years of 1980 and 1985, gaining a Bachelor of Arts. He became engaged and married to an Algerian woman during this time. After returning, he took postgraduate studies at the University of Algiers and gained a position as an imam, and as an associate professor of theology at the University of Algiers.

=== 1991–2000: Algeria and Europe ===
In 1991, Algeria held its first multiparty elections since independence. Ahmed Zaoui stood as a candidate for the Islamic Salvation Front (Front Islamique du Salut or FIS). However, the government cancelled 1991 elections after the first round results showed that the FIS would win, citing fears that the Islamist party would end democracy. When the government then banned the FIS and arrested thousands of its members, Islamist guerrillas rapidly emerged and began an armed campaign against the government and its supporters which became the Algerian Civil War.

In 1993, Zaoui fled to Europe. He was tried and convicted in absentia by the Algerian government and was convicted of "establishing a terrorist organisation to destabilise state institutions and terrorise the population" and for "plotting against the state, criminal conspiracy, inciting armed rebellion and assassinations and destruction of property" in May 1996, and February 1997, respectively. Both convictions carry sentences of life imprisonment. Disputing the reports from Interpol as incomplete, Zaoui claimed and the New Zealand Refugee Status Appeals Authority (RSAA) found that there were six life sentences against him, as well as two death sentences. Human rights groups have criticised the Algerian trials for contravening basic norms of justice.

In March 1994, Belgium charged him with being "the instigator or the head of a criminal organisation" and two charges of using false passports. He was acquitted at his first trial but was convicted on appeal and received a four-year suspended sentence.

While still under a Belgian home detention order which limited his movements to the street he lived on, he travelled illegally to Switzerland. The Swiss authorities refused his request for asylum due to his ongoing political activities, and made a deal with Burkina Faso to deport Zaoui and his family there, while still providing Zaoui with a 1500 Swiss franc monthly allowance.

=== 2000–2002: Travel to Asia then New Zealand ===
Zaoui left Burkina Faso and travelled to Malaysia with his family in 2000. He engaged in political activity with the FIS in exile.

In 2001 France convicted him in absentia for "participation in a criminal group with a view to preparing terrorist acts".

During his time in Malaysia, the head of the Algerian police services visited to observe Malaysian policing methods. Zaoui believed that this was a pretext, that the real reason was his presence in Malaysia, and that the Malaysian authorities were preparing to detain him. He decided to leave Malaysia, and on 2 December 2002 he arrived in New Zealand via Vietnam on a fake South African passport.

== Imprisonment in New Zealand ==
En route to New Zealand, Zaoui attempted to destroy his fake South African passport, and upon arrival, applied for refugee status. Although his identity was initially secret, his name was illegally leaked to the media, and he became the subject of political debate and media scrutiny.

His initial application for refugee status to the Refugee Status Branch (RSB) of the New Zealand Immigration Service was declined. Although he was recognised as having a well founded fear of persecution, he was excluded as the RSB held there was reason to believe he had committed serious criminal or terrorist activities, primarily on evidence given by the New Zealand Security Intelligence Service and on his conviction in Belgium.

The SIS issued a security risk certificate in March 2003. Mr Zaoui then requested a review of the certificate. While not made public at the time, in February 2004 the High Court ordered the SIS to release the summary of its allegations to Zaoui's lawyers, who then released it to the media. The summary excluded classified information which the SIS was not required to disclose. Zaoui's lawyers issued a point-by-point response to the summary.

After his arrest, he was initially confined for ten months in the maximum security Paremoremo Prison where he was placed on a "non-association regime". While Zaoui and his supporters have characterised this as being in solitary confinement; this was dismissed as a "myth" by the Department of Corrections. However, in October 2003 his case was reviewed, and citing the "likely length of time before legal proceedings conclude", the Department of Corrections transferred him to the medium security Auckland Remand Prison where he was placed on a ‘normal association regime".

=== Refugee status ===
In August 2003 the Refugee Status Appeals Authority declared both his Belgian and French trials to be "unsafe" and granted Zaoui refugee status. Commenting on the information available to them in order to evaluate Zaoui's claim, the RSAA stated that they "...were surprised at how limited it was and the questionable nature of some of the contents" and that "...it does not provide evidence that he has committed, directed or participated in any act of violence or terrorism that would require his being excluded under Article 1F from the protection of the Refugee Convention."

=== Political attention and cause célèbre ===
The case attracted considerable media and political attention. The New Zealand Government defended the treatment of Zaoui, and maintained they had information that he was a credible risk. In September 2004, Prime Minister Helen Clark's office stated that Zaoui had links to al Qaeda, but Clark later withdrew the claim, saying that her "office had probably gone too far in making the link". The New Zealand First Party attacked Mr Zaoui's claim to asylum, while the Greens challenged the processes that saw him imprisoned and at risk of deportation.

On 20 October 2004, many of his supporters participated in a launch of a biographical book in the Beehive foyer in Wellington.

In October 2005 Zaoui published Migrant Birds, a book of 24 poems he wrote as a response to being imprisoned. The poems are in Arabic and English. A 25th poem, He will come back, the one I'm waiting for, was called the most important New Zealand poem of 2004 by Emma Neale, editor of Best New Zealand Poems 2004.

His case received attention from a number of celebrities and prominent New Zealanders. He was featured in the music video for Dave Dobbyn's Welcome Home, and also appeared on stage with Dobbyn when the song was performed at the New Zealand Music Awards.

=== Bail ===
On 9 December 2004 the Supreme Court of New Zealand granted Zaoui bail. Despite Crown opposition, the Court allowed him to reside in the Dominican Priory in central Auckland. He was required to report to the police twice a week and spend each night in the priory between 10pm and 6am.

=== Withdrawal of the security risk certificate ===
On 13 September 2007, the head of the Security Intelligence Service, Dr Warren Tucker, withdrew the security risk certificate against Zaoui citing three main reasons:

1. Mr Zaoui's cooperation in providing information to the authorities.
2. Additional classified information which showed that his associates were involved in terrorism, but not Zaoui himself.
3. The length of time he has been in New Zealand, and the length of time which has passed from the offences he was convicted of.

The withdrawal of the security risk certificate means that the New Zealand Government has withdrawn its security objections to his refugee status, which was confirmed by the RSAA in August 2003. Zaoui was "thrilled and delighted," and stated that he was "...happy not just because my name has been cleared but because the whole system of security risk certificates can now be reviewed."

== Resolution, citizenship and arrest ==
On 29 September 2005 a referendum was held in Algeria which resulted in the Charter for Peace and National Reconciliation, and gave amnesty to those jailed and convicted during the civil war, and critics have maintained that he is free to return safely. However, Zaoui has been granted refugee status in New Zealand, and is free to stay in the country.

Zaoui has a wife and four children who had been living illegally in Kuala Lumpur, Malaysia since 2000 until they joined him in New Zealand on 26 October 2007.

A previous application for them to come to New Zealand was lodged in late 2006, but at that time, Immigration Minister David Cunliffe said it would not be appropriate while the status of Zaoui's security risk certificate was being determined.

In 2009, Zaoui and his family moved to Palmerston North where he intended to study at Massey University. He initially worked part-time with the Manawatu Muslim Association. He opened a kebab stall called the Desert Rose in Palmerston North. In early 2012, Zaoui moved back to Auckland and started working at a food court on Karangahape Road. He was granted New Zealand citizenship in May 2014.

Since receiving New Zealand citizenship, Zaoui has returned to visit Algeria to participate in pro-democracy activism.

In 2023, Zaoui was arrested at gunpoint in Médéa after holding a political meeting at his house. Eight officers, accompanied by twelve vehicles, surrounded his home. After searching for weapons, he was placed under arrest. It was revealed on 24 October that Zaoui had been charged with subversion and had been moved to the Koléa Prison in Koléa.

== Publications ==
- Migrant Birds (2005) ISBN 1-877333-36-0
- O Poetry, My Shadow in Landfall Issue 211 (Autumn 2006) edited by Tze Ming Mok ISBN 1-877372-90-0
