= New Zealand passport =

New Zealand passport; Uruwhenua Aotearoa
- The front cover of a contemporary New Zealand biometric passport
- Type: Passport
- Issued by: Department of Internal Affairs
- First issued: 1915 (first version); 1992 (machine-readable passport); 4 November 2005 (biometric passport); 3 May 2021 (current version)
- Purpose: Identification & travel
- Valid in: All countries
- Eligibility: New Zealand Citizenship
- Expiration: Age at date of Application: 15-: 5 Years from Date of Issue 16+: 10 Years from Date of Issue
- Cost: Adult (16+): Regular: $247.00; Urgent: $494.00; Callout: $1,001.00; Child (under 16): Regular: $144.00; Urgent: $391.00; Callout: $898.00; Prices in NZD and inclusive of GST

New Zealand passports (Māori: uruwhenua o Aotearoa) are passports issued to New Zealand citizens for the purpose of international travel by the Department of Internal Affairs. New Zealand has a passport possession rate of around 70% of the population and there are around 2.9 million New Zealand passports in circulation.

== History ==
=== Early 20th century: Passports introduced ===
Few countries required passports before the First World War, and they were not then usually required for overseas travel. By 1900 there were occasional requests for New Zealand passports, which were personally signed by the Governor. In 1905 MP George Fowlds decided to return to Scotland for his father's 100th birthday. He decided he needed a passport when his ship was about to leave; an inconvenience both for the department and the Governor who had to sign it. A single passport covered a man and his wife and children, but did not include a photo or any personal details like age, height, or eye colour. In 1909 a passport was issued to Victor Reeves Packham, agricultural chemist; see file online.

In the First World War the British Government required passports in 1915, and New Zealand followed from November 1915, with an increased workload for the department and for police. 1,108 passports had been issued in 1909, but 6,000 were issued in the nine months from 15 November 1915 to 21 August 1916. The number was kept high by civilian travel after the war, over 4,300 in 1921, and the number hovered at that level until the Depression. The number then fell from 4,722 in 1930 to 2,455 for the year ended 31 March 1934.

=== 1950s: New Zealand citizenship introduced ===
After the creation of modern New Zealand citizenship with the passing of the British Nationality and New Zealand Citizenship Act 1948 (which came into force on 1 January 1949), residence in New Zealand no longer qualified British or Commonwealth citizens for a New Zealand passport, and they had to apply for New Zealand citizenship then for a passport, with increased work for the Department of Internal Affairs. In 1950 the number of passports issued topped ten thousand, twice as many as were issued in 1939. Between 1948 and 1977, New Zealand passports bore the words 'New Zealand citizen and British subject'.

Starting on 1 July 1981, the Fraser government announced that New Zealand citizens could no longer travel to Australia without passports, and non-citizen New Zealand residents were required to apply for a visa. This was because it was felt that too many people who were not entitled to travel without passports to Australia were passing themselves off as New Zealanders.

=== 1990s: Machine-readable passports ===
In 1992, the Department of Internal Affairs started issuing machine-readable passports in New Zealand, whilst New Zealand overseas posts continued to issue manual passports. Since 24 February 1992, children's names have no longer been endorsed in the passports of their parents. In February 1997, the New Zealand High Commission in London began issuing machine readable passports.

In December 2000, French was removed from the biodata page of the New Zealand passport and replaced with Māori – this change was brought about by the Department of Internal Affairs, which "signals the status of Te Reo Māori as an official language of New Zealand and to give New Zealanders travelling abroad a passport that more accurately reflects their national identity".

In 2001, the Department of Internal Affairs took over responsibility for the London Passport Office from the Ministry of Foreign Affairs and Trade.

=== 2000s: Phasing out non-machine-readable passports ===
By 2003, only around 4% of all New Zealand passport holders still held a non-machine readable version.

On 26 October 2004, New Zealand diplomatic posts stopped issuing manual passports and, on the same day, began issuing short-term machine-readable emergency travel documents for New Zealand citizens who need to travel urgently. One of the reasons for reducing the number of non-machine readable passports in circulation was to increase the security of New Zealand passports; another was that, starting on this day, New Zealanders travelling to the United States under the Visa Waiver Program were required to enter on a machine readable passport.

From this date onwards, all New Zealand citizens applying for a passport overseas have had to send their application to the Passport Office in New Zealand, Sydney or London. It also meant that all New Zealand passports issued on or after 26 October 2004 were machine-readable. Remaining non-machine readable New Zealand passports (M series) were still valid and expired by 25 October 2014 at the latest (only around 2% of New Zealand passport holders still had a non-machine readable version as of that date).

=== 2005: Biometric passports ===
On 4 November 2005, the Department of Internal Affairs began issuing New Zealand biometric passports (EA series). In order to cover the higher costs associated with the production of biometric passports (compared with the previous machine readable passports), the application cost increased from NZ$71 to NZ$150 for adults and from NZ$36 to NZ$80 for children.

All passports issued from 24 April 2005 to 29 November 2015—both adult and child—have a maximum passport validity of five years as a result of the Passports Amendment Act (2005). Passports that were issued prior to 24 April 2005 remained valid until the date of expiry as stated on the biodata page. From 24 April 2005, New Zealand passports were no longer endorsed with name changes, which meant that, for example, changing to a married name required applying for a new passport.

=== 2009: New passport design ===
On 23 November 2009, the Department of Internal Affairs launched a new version of the biometric passport (LA series), supplied under a contract with the Canadian Bank Note Company at a cost of just under $100 million over five years. One of the motivations for a new passport design was to ensure that it would remain difficult to produce counterfeit New Zealand passports. Unlike the previous biometric passport, photographs on the biodata page are now laser engraved in black and white for extra security.

=== 2014: Validity restored to 10 years ===
On 29 May 2014, after considering the Petition of Kyle Lockwood, the Government Administration Committee recommended to the New Zealand government that ten-year passports for adults be reinstated. The committee concluded "On the evidence received, we are not convinced that the reduction in detected fraudulent passports is a result of the shorter validity period. It seems more likely to us that the introduction of biometric passports has lessened fraud and counterfeiting. The international standard among countries such as Australia, France, Germany, the United Kingdom, and the United States of America, who use similar biometric passports, is ten years. The biometric security features have led countries such as China, Canada and the Netherlands to reintroduce ten-year passports. We support the intent of the petition." Law changes were passed in 2015 and since 30 November 2015, 10-year passports are available again for New Zealanders aged 16 and over; passports for children under 16 are still only valid for 5 years.

=== 2021: Passport design updated ===
On 3 May 2021, the Department of Internal Affairs launched an updated version of the biometric passport (RA series). The RA series passports contain new and improved security features; also, te reo Māori appears first on the cover and throughout the passport book. Owing largely to the impacts of the COVID-19 pandemic on travel, existing stock of the previous series continued to be issued until depletion.

=== 2025: English-first policy ===
On 25 July 2025, the Internal Affairs Minister Brooke van Velden confirmed that the English language would take precedence over the Māori language on the front cover of the New Zealand passport. In 2021, the passport cover design had been updated to have the Māori words "Uruwhenua Aotearoa" printed above the words "New Zealand passport". Van Velden said that this change reflected the New Zealand Government's commitment to prioritising English. The New Zealand First party's leader Winston Peters had previously lobbied for the Government's English-first policy. In response, Te Pāti Māori co-leader Debbie Ngarewa-Packer said that the policy change undermined New Zealand's commitment to recognising indigenous rights while Green Party MP Benjamin Doyle accused the Government of stripping minority rights away.

== Passports issue statistics ==
The number of New Zealand passports and travel documents issued by year is as follows:

Year	Passports (standard service)	Passports (urgent service)	Emergency travel documents, refugee travel documents and certificates of identity
2013–14	591,051	47,939	Unknown
2012–13	570,506	45,078	1,367
2011–12	557,473	45,898	1,385
2010–11	512,017	45,073	1,469
2009–10	396,048	36,841	1,255
2008–09	352,246	34,659	1,173
2007–08	375,585	35,812	1,239
2006–07	398,040		
2005–06	385,966		
2004–05	411,986		
2003–04	390,419		
2002–03	279,810	29,741	6,212
2001–02	289,695	28,513	6,120
2000–01	308,399	32,674	6,570
1999–00	308,691	28,733	6,823
1998–99	303,316	26,526	7,664

== Passport entitlement ==
Only New Zealand citizens are entitled to be issued New Zealand passports. However, other travel documents are available from the Department of Internal Affairs for New Zealand refugees or residents who are unable to obtain passports from their home countries but need to travel; see New Zealand Refugee Travel Document and New Zealand Certificate of Identity.

== Types ==
Type	Usage	Front Cover Image	Biodata Page Image
Ordinary	Issued to New Zealand citizens for ordinary travel, such as holidays and business trips.	New Zealand Ordinary Passport cover	
Diplomatic	Issued to New Zealand diplomats, top ranking government officials (such as the prime minister) and diplomatic couriers. Note: Holders of a diplomatic / official passport must use their ordinary passport if their travel is for non-official / diplomatic reasons.	New Zealand Diplomatic Passport cover	
Official	Issued to individuals representing the New Zealand government on official business. Officials are encouraged to use a standard passport if possible and only apply for an official passport if there are potential hostilities or visa issues. Note: Holders of a diplomatic / official passport must use their ordinary passport if their travel is for non-official / diplomatic reasons.	New Zealand Official Passport cover	
Emergency Travel Document	Issued for urgent travel only.	New Zealand Emergency Travel Document cover	
Certificate of Identity	Issued for alien residents of New Zealand who are unable to obtain a national passport.	New Zealand Certificate of Identity cover	
Refugee Travel Document	Issued for recognised refugees in New Zealand.	New Zealand Refugee Travel Document cover	

== Obtaining a passport ==
=== Application procedure ===
The Department of Internal Affairs is responsible for issuing New Zealand passports. The Department of Internal Affairs issues passports from its offices in Auckland, Christchurch and Wellington in New Zealand, as well as overseas offices in Sydney and London. New Zealand embassies, High Commissions and consulates outside of Sydney and London are not able to issue passports, although diplomatic officers may be able to provide application forms and assist in communicating with an issuing office.

Adult passports now can be applied through online for both first time and renewals. Standard processing time is up to 10 working days plus delivery, unless an urgent or call-out service is requested. There are online fees for Australia and the UK as well as New Zealand.

As of September 2024, a standard passport costs $220 for adults and $130 for children, including delivery within New Zealand.

=== Urgent travel ===
In emergencies, some New Zealand embassies, High Commissions and consulates may be able to issue an Emergency Travel Document with a validity of only one year intended to assist New Zealand citizens who do not have the time to obtain a passport in time to travel. An application for a New Zealand Emergency Travel Document (ETD) costs NZ$596 and includes the fee for a full replacement passport before the expiration of the ETD. In countries where there is no New Zealand diplomatic post, New Zealand citizens who need to travel urgently and whose passport has expired, been lost or been stolen can be issued with an Emergency Travel Document at a cost of £95 by a British foreign mission as long as this has been cleared with the New Zealand Ministry of Foreign Affairs and Trade.

=== New Zealand citizenship ===
As an alternative to obtaining a New Zealand passport, New Zealand citizens with another nationality and a foreign passport/travel document can apply for an endorsement indicating New Zealand citizenship from Immigration New Zealand (INZ). The endorsement can either be physically affixed inside the foreign passport/travel document or can be electronically linked in INZ's database to the foreign passport/travel document. An endorsement indicating New Zealand citizenship is valid for the duration of the foreign passport/travel document it is endorsed in or electronically linked to. An endorsement indicating New Zealand citizenship costs NZ$130 for first time applications and NZ$80 for subsequent applications, which means that it is cheaper than obtaining a regular adult New Zealand passport. The fee for the endorsement is completely waived if electronically linked to or affixed inside a passport issued by Austria, Finland, Greece, Iceland, Israel, Italy or Turkey. Given that the maximum validity of New Zealand passports is 10 years for adults and 5 years for under 16 year olds, an endorsement indicating New Zealand citizenship may work out to be an even more economic option if affixed inside or linked electronically to a foreign passport/travel document which has a longer validity (e.g. 10 years). It is also easier to obtain an endorsement indicating New Zealand citizenship than a New Zealand passport overseas, since an endorsement can be issued at INZ offices in Apia, Bangkok, Beijing, Ho Chi Minh City, Hong Kong, Jakarta, London, Moscow, Mumbai, New Delhi, Nukuʻalofa, Pretoria, Shanghai, Singapore, Suva, Sydney and Taipei, whilst New Zealand passports are only issued overseas by the Department of Internal Affairs in Sydney and London. However, New Zealand citizens with dual/multiple nationality travelling on a passport/travel document issued by another country may be unable to access New Zealand consular assistance whilst overseas and may not be able to enjoy as many visa exemptions. For example, a dual New Zealand and Samoan citizen travelling only on a Samoan passport with an endorsement indicating New Zealand citizenship affixed inside is unable to obtain a Special Category Visa (SCV) upon arrival in Australia and must obtain an Australian visitor visa before travelling, since to obtain an SCV a New Zealand citizen must present a valid New Zealand passport.

=== Return travel without a passport ===
In general, to establish his/her right to enter New Zealand, a New Zealand citizen is required to present a valid New Zealand passport or a passport issued by another country that is electronically linked or physically affixed with an endorsement indicating New Zealand citizenship.

However, a New Zealand embassy, high commission or consulate or an Immigration New Zealand branch can request that the immigration officer at a port of entry in New Zealand not demand to see a passport of a New Zealand citizen in urgent or compassionate circumstances (e.g. death or serious illness) where there is not enough time for a New Zealand passport to be issued.

== Physical appearance ==
=== Cover ===
The current version of New Zealand passports issued since May 2021 are black, with the New Zealand coat of arms emblazoned in silver in the centre of the front cover. The words "URUWHENUA AOTEAROA" and "NEW ZEALAND PASSPORT" are inscribed above the coat of arms in silver. The standard biometric symbol appears at the bottom of the front cover. Both the front and back covers have silver ferns embossed on the outside edge.

Prior to May 2021, English was displayed first, then Māori.

Regular passports issued prior to November 2009 had a navy blue cover.

=== Passport note ===
Passports contain a note from the issuing state that is addressed to the authorities of all other states, identifying the bearer as a citizen of that state and requesting that he or she be allowed to pass and be treated according to international norms. The note inside New Zealand passports states:

The Governor-General in the Realm of New Zealand requests in the Name of His Majesty The King all whom it may concern to allow the holder to pass without delay or hindrance and in case of need to give all lawful assistance and protection.

and in Māori:

He tono tēnei nā te Kāwana Tianara o te Whenua o Aotearoa, i raro i te mana o Te Arikinui Kīngi Tiāre te Tuatoru, ki te hunga e whaipānga ana, kia kaua e akutōia, e whakakōpekatia rānei te kaipupuri i te uruwhenua nei i āna haere, ā, i te wā e hiahiatia ana, me āwhina ā-ture, me manaaki anō hoki.

After the passing of Queen Elizabeth II, New Zealand passports continued to bear the name of "Her Majesty" in the passport note until stock of blank passports depleted. Newly issued New Zealand passports now bear the aforementioned in the passport note.

=== Languages ===
The textual portions of New Zealand passports are printed in both Māori and English. (Previously English and French.)

=== Biodata page ===
Design of the biodata page

The biodata page of the current version of the New Zealand passport includes the following data:

- Photo of the passport holder (in black and white)
- Type (Momo): P
- Country (Whenua): NZL
- Passport No. (Tau Uruwhenua)
- Surname (Ingoa whānau)
- Given names (Ingoa ake)
- Nationality (Iwi tūturu): NEW ZEALAND
- Date of birth (Rā whānau)
- Sex (Tāne-Wahine)
- Place of birth (Wāhi whānau) (Passports issued after December 2005 will only include the city of birth)
- Date of issue (Rā tīmatanga)
- Date of expiry (Rā mutunga)
- Authority (Te Mana Tuku)

The information page ends with the Machine Readable Zone.

== Legal issues ==
Under the Passports Act 1992, the Minister of Internal Affairs has the power to refuse a passport, for example, on grounds of national security.

The Minister also has the discretion to issue a passport for less than the current ten-year validity period.

== Five Nations Passport Group ==
New Zealand participates in the Five Nations Passport Group, an international forum for cooperation between the passport issuing authorities in Australia, Canada, the United Kingdom, and the United States to "share best practices and discuss innovations related to the development of passport policies, products and practices".

== Incidents ==
In 2004, two Israelis, suspected agents working for Mossad, Eli Cara and Uriel Kelman, were convicted and jailed for attempting to obtain New Zealand passports by submitting fraudulent applications. A third suspected Mossad agent, Zev William Barkan, who was a former Israeli diplomat based in Europe was involved in stealing the identity of a tetraplegic Auckland resident to obtain a passport fraudulently in his name. A year later the Israeli government formally apologised to the New Zealand government for the actions of its citizens.

In the immediate aftermath of the 2011 Christchurch earthquake, concerns were raised that a group of Israelis may have again been attempting to fraudulently obtain New Zealand passports, but scant evidence of this has been found to date.

After Ofer Mizrahi, an Israeli national, died after being crushed by falling masonry in a parked van, he was found in possession of more than one foreign passport and the New Zealand government investigated whether he and his companions had links to Mossad. There were concerns that the travellers may have been trying to infiltrate the police national computer system to gain access to information which could be used to clone New Zealand passports.

His surviving travelling companions, Michal Fraidman, Liron Sade and Guy Jordan, met with Israeli officials and left New Zealand within twelve hours of the earthquake. After investigations by the police and SIS, Prime Minister Key said that they found Mossad was not involved, and that: "There is, in the view of those agencies, no link between those individuals and Israeli intelligence agencies. There was no evidence found to suggest there were anything other than backpackers".

== Visa requirements ==
Visa requirements for New Zealand citizens New Zealand Trans-Tasman Travel Arrangement Visa free access / ETA / ESTA Visa issued upon arrival eVisa Both visa on arrival and eVisa available Visa required prior to arrival

As of July 2023, New Zealand citizens had visa-free or visa on arrival access to 187 countries and territories, ranking the New Zealand passport 5th in terms of travel freedom according to the Henley Passport Index. Additionally, Arton Capital's Passport Index ranked the New Zealand passport 6th in the world in terms of travel freedom, with a visa-free score of 162 (tied with Icelandic and Maltese passports), as of 2 December 2018.

== Foreign travel statistics ==
The following table shows New Zealand residents re-entering New Zealand during 2024 after an absence of less than 12 months, by the main country visited.

Foreign travel statistics
Destination	Number of New Zealand visitors
Australia	1,225,491
Cook Islands	108,590
Fiji	212,397
French Polynesia	8,977
New Caledonia	3,497
Niue	7,985
Samoa	67,212
Tonga	28,460
Vanuatu	13,207
Cambodia	5,374
China	150,140
Hong Kong	16,087
India	101,447
Indonesia	84,382
Japan	76,297
South Korea	25,133
Malaysia	23,370
Nepal	3,942
Pakistan	3,411
Philippines	47,889
Singapore	22,575
Sri Lanka	11,890
Taiwan	14,528
Thailand	44,732
Vietnam	28,691
Austria	5,751
Croatia	4,104
France	21,661
Germany	16,411
Greece	7,337
Ireland	8,798
Italy	32,391
Netherlands	8,195
Spain	15,558
Switzerland	4,605
United Kingdom	117,968
Argentina	4,309
Brazil	5,679
Canada	32,875
Chile	4,793
Mexico	6,034
United States	167,482
South Africa	20,278
Turkey	5,476
United Arab Emirates	7,240

== Previous Passports ==
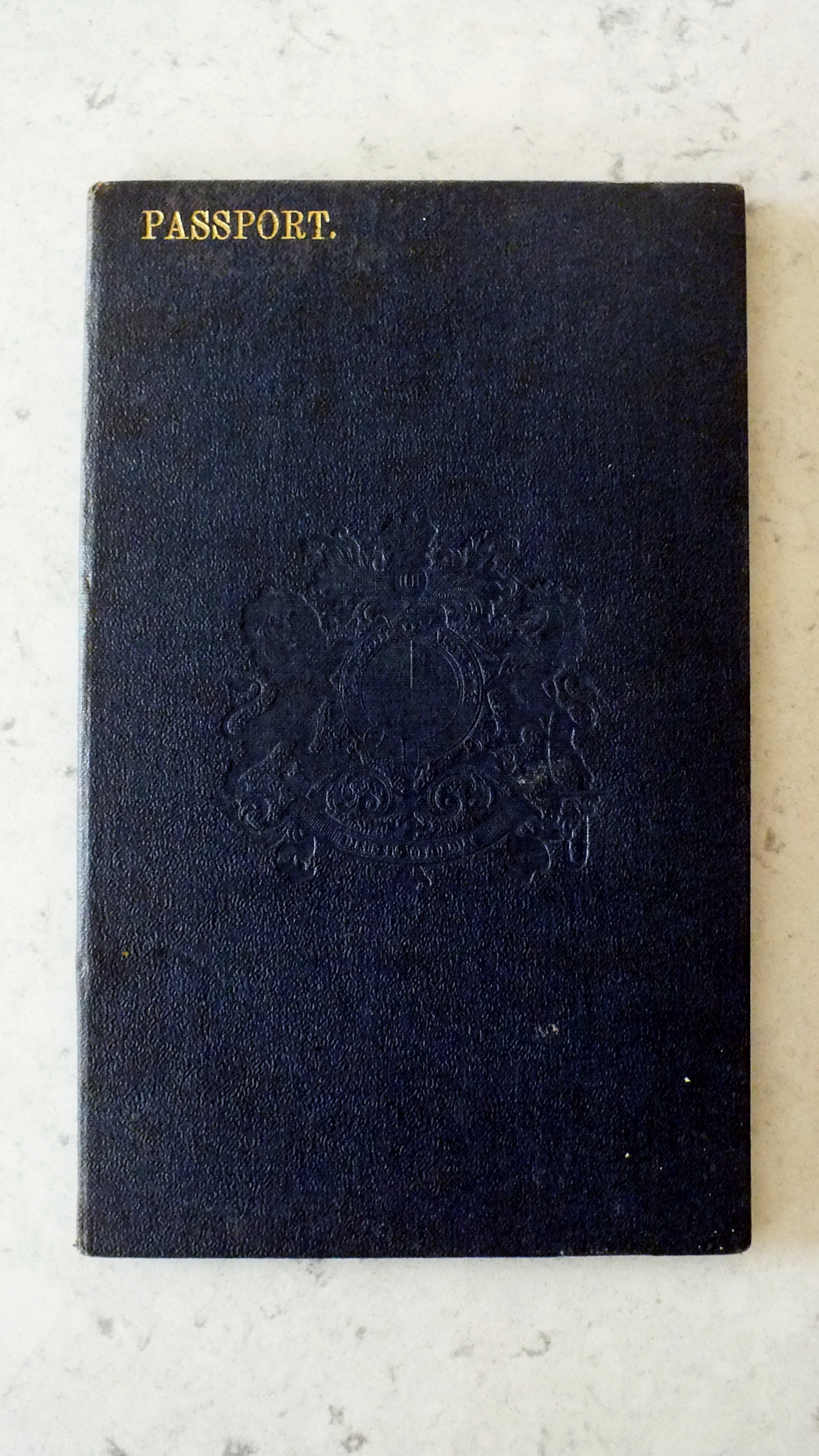
First New Zealand photo identification passport type issued between c. 1915 and 1923.

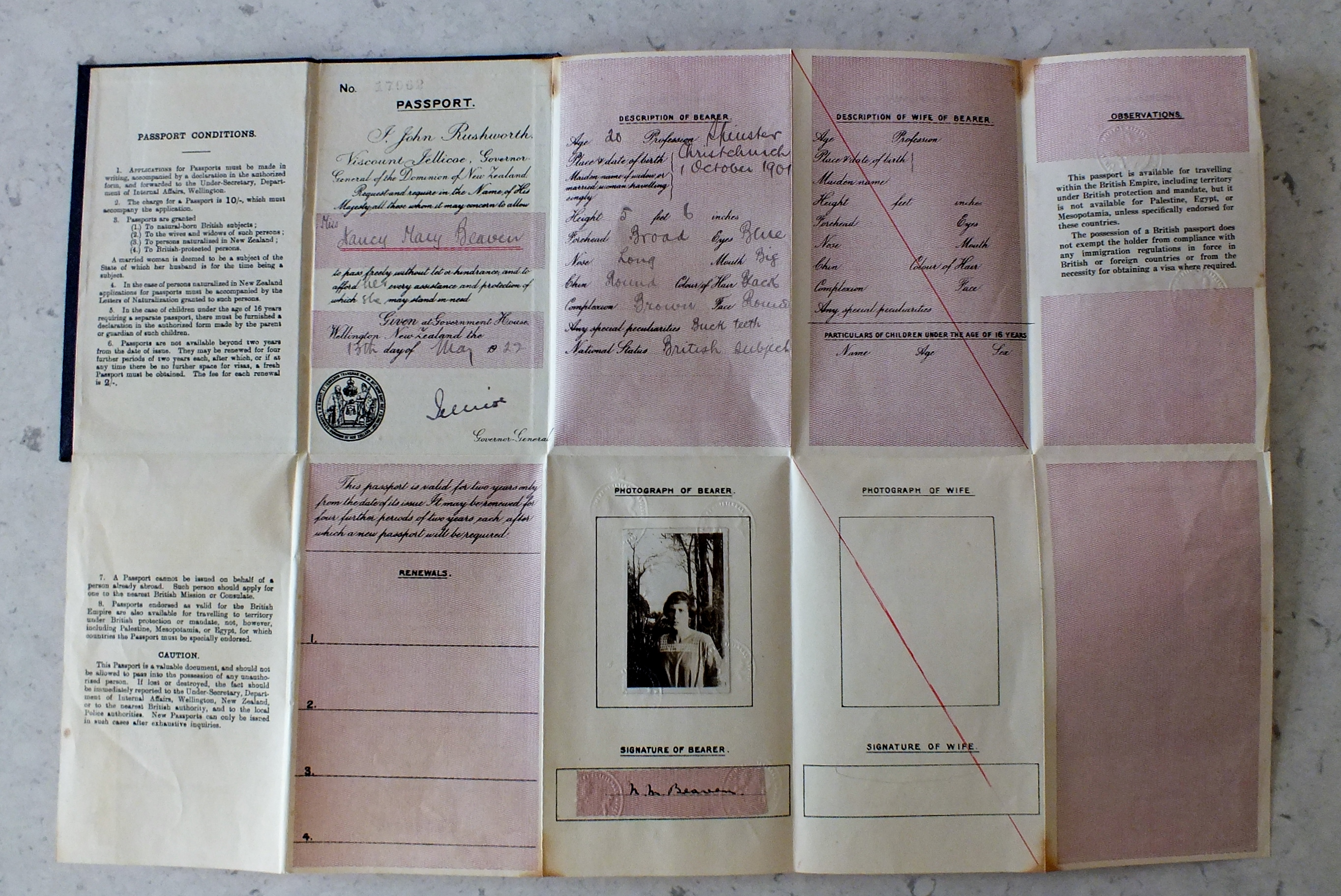
Interior of the first type of photo I.D New Zealand passport. This fold-out sort was replaced by the familiar booklet form around 1923, some time after the type had been phased out in most other parts of the British Empire.

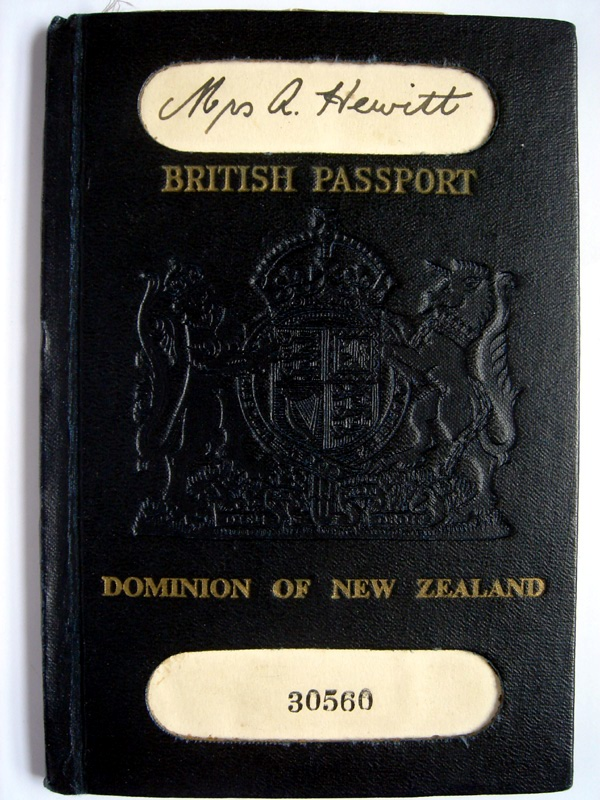
New Zealand passport issued in 1949

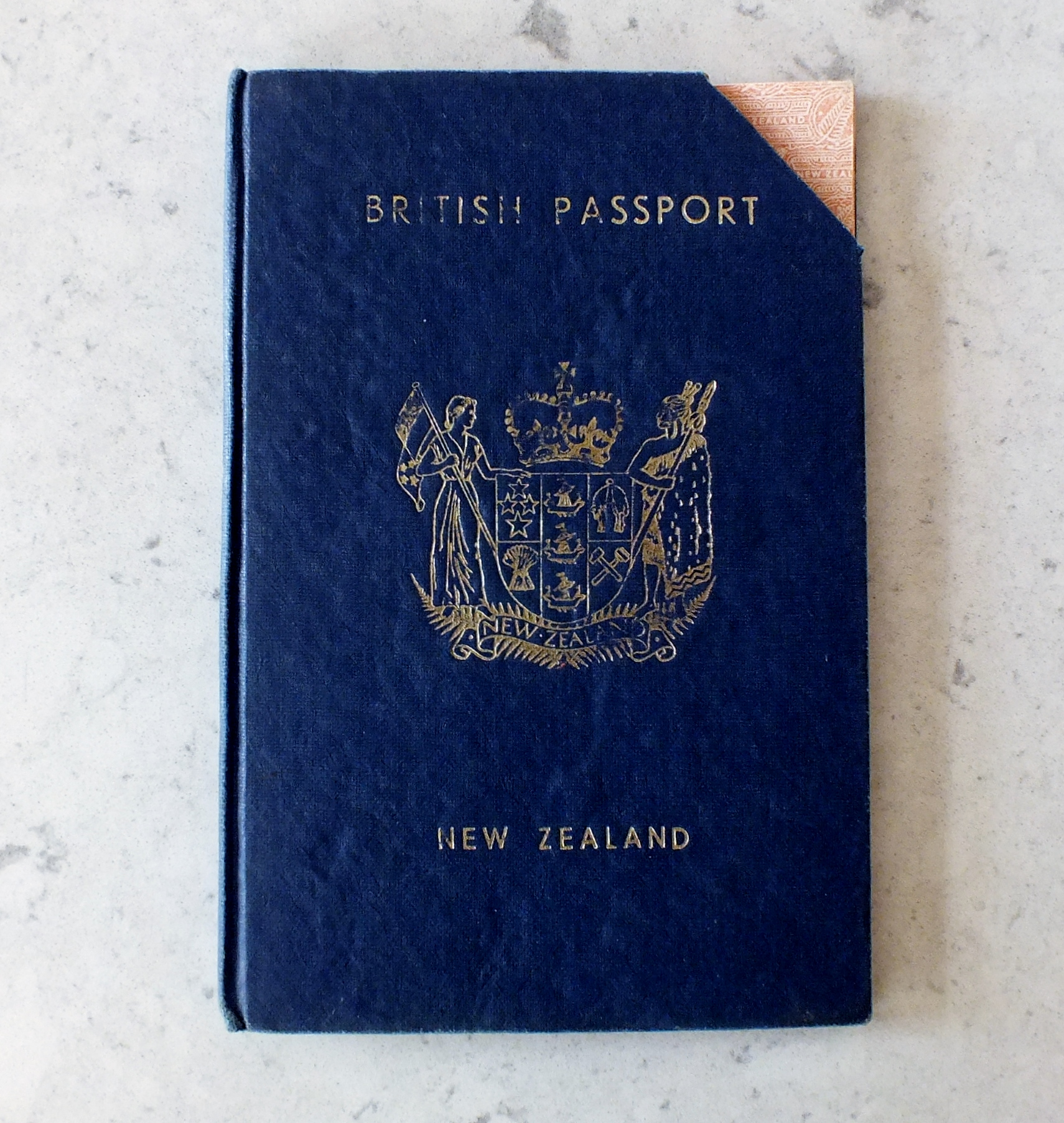
Third type of New Zealand passport which superseded the 'Dominion of New Zealand' type 2. Used through the 1950s and 1960s and replaced in 1973.

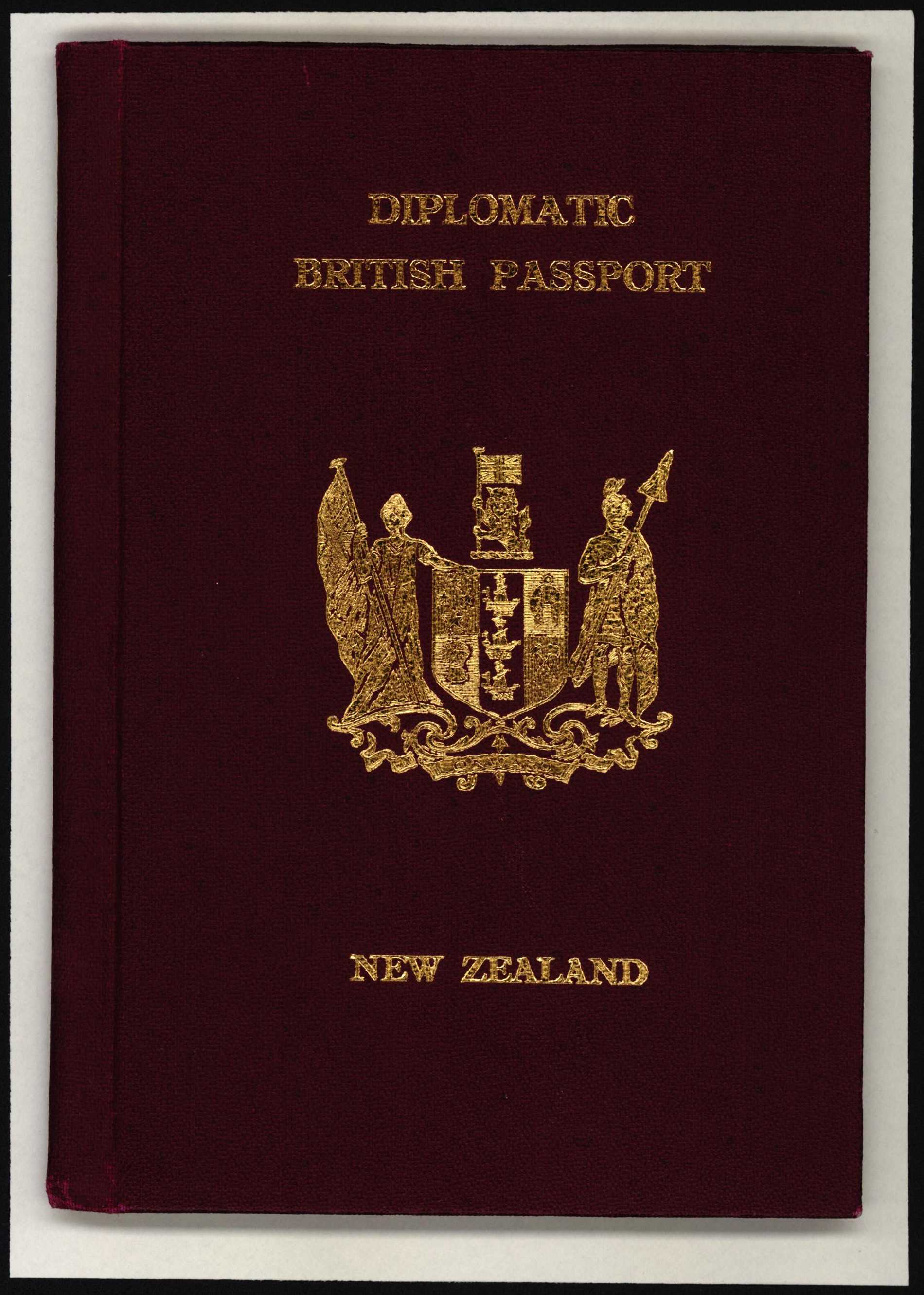
An example of a diplomatic passport from 1952

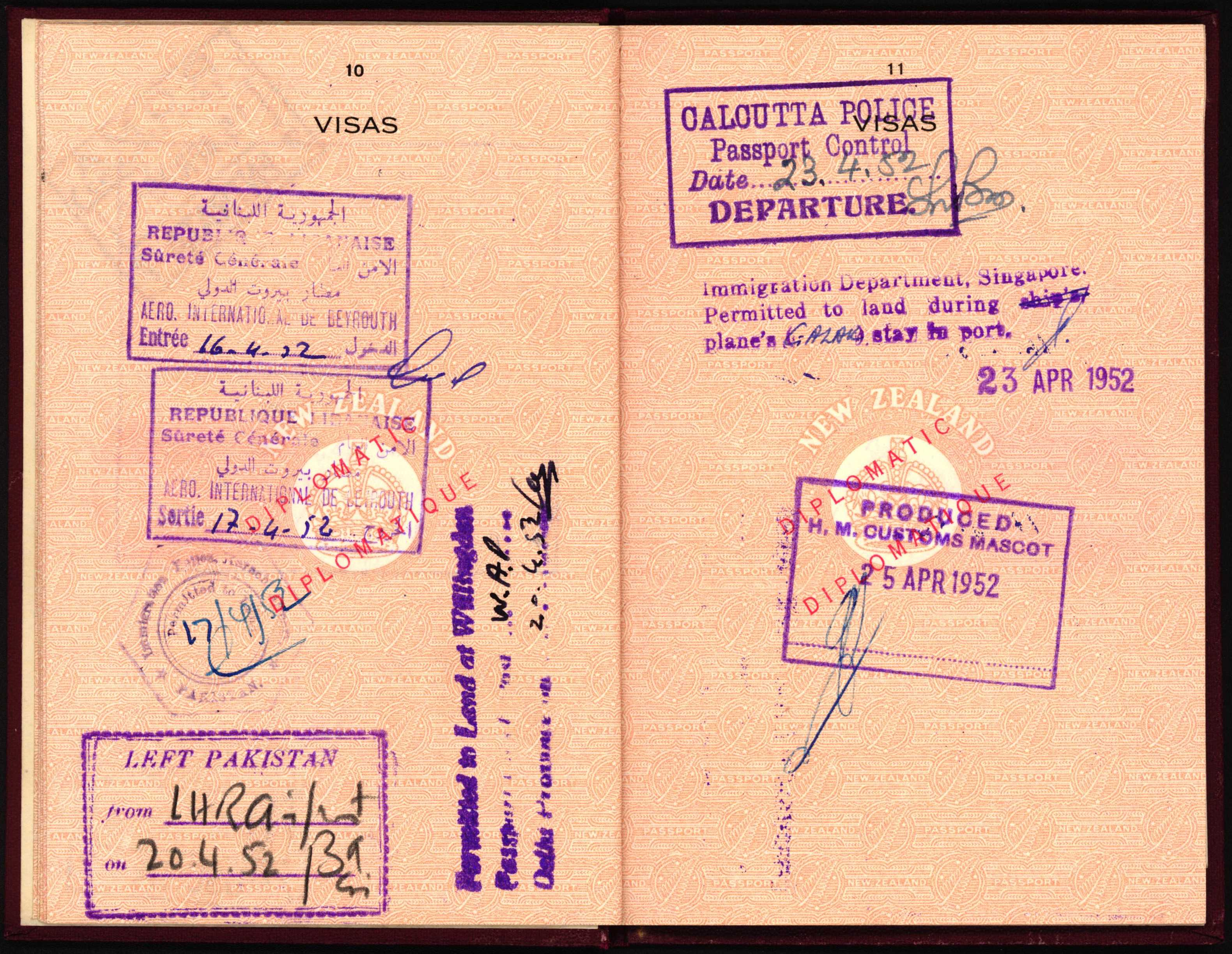
Interior of a 1952 issued diplomatic passport

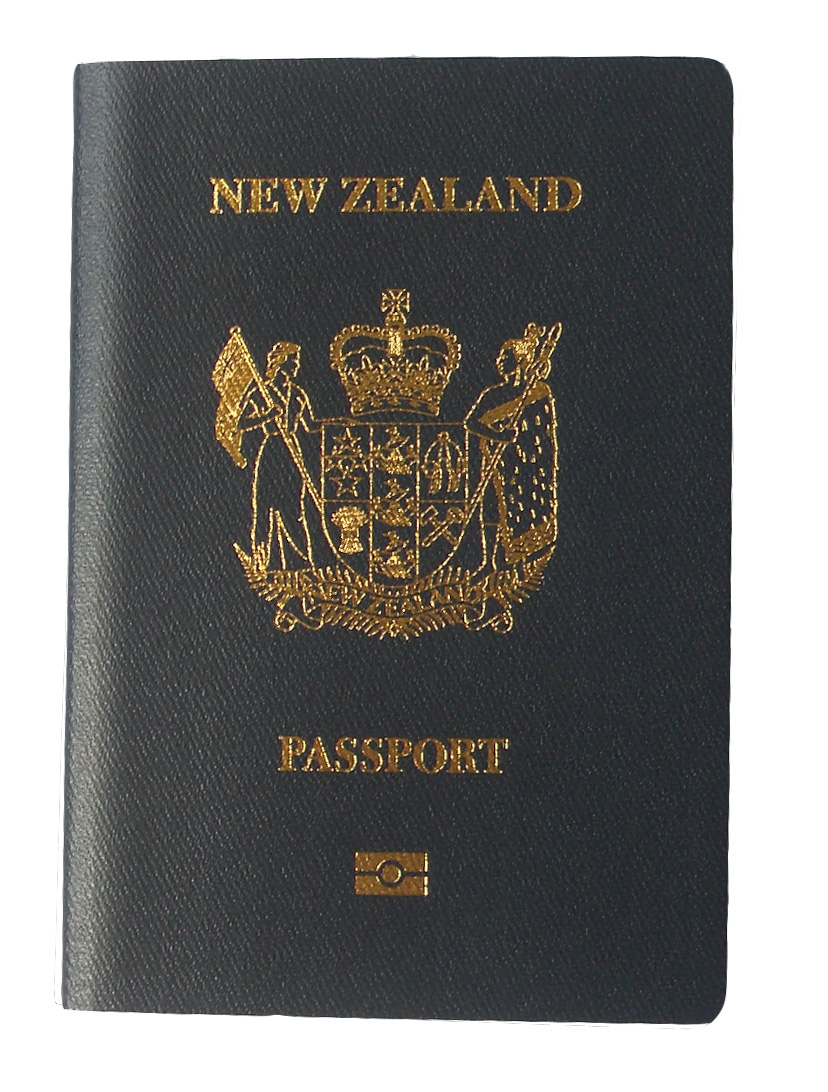
New Zealand biometric passport issued between November 2005 and November 2009

== See also ==
- Visa requirements for New Zealand citizens
- New Zealand nationality law
- Australian passport
- Smartgate
- Five Nations Passport Group
