= Passport validity =

Length of time a passport can be legally used

Passport validity is the length of time a passport can be used to travel to another country, or be used as a valid form of identification within or outside the issuing country before its date of expiration.

== Adult passport validity map ==
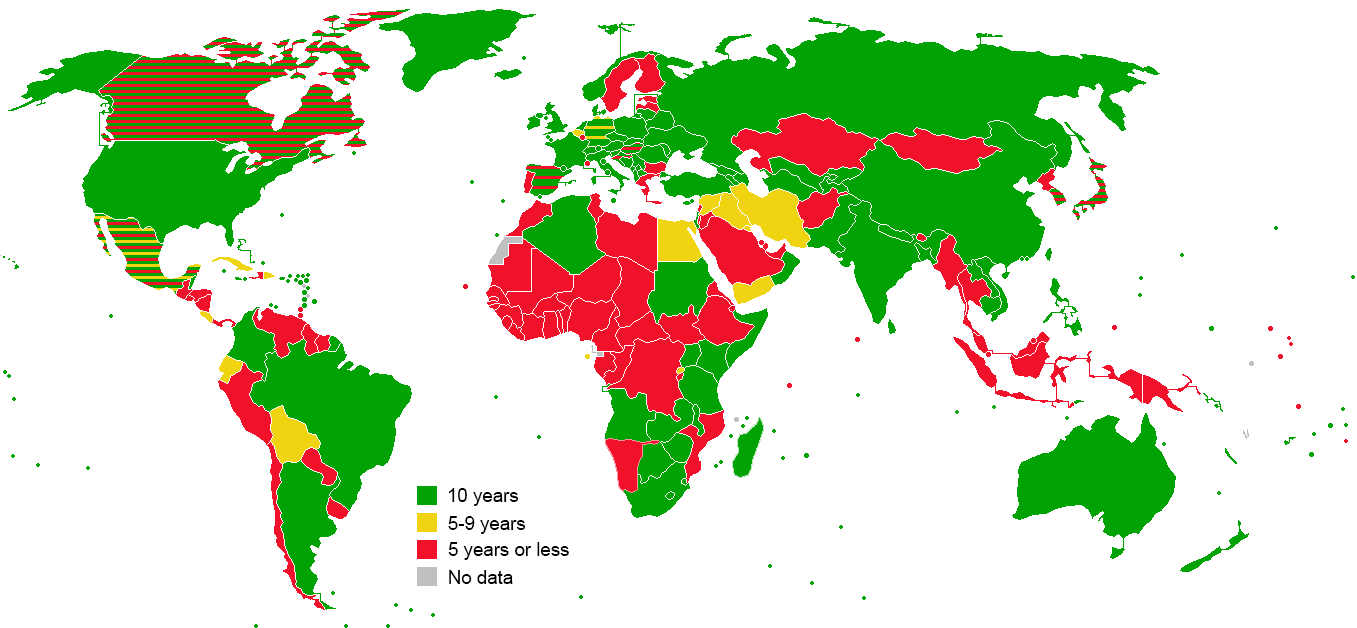
Adult passport validity across the world

=== Adult passports ===
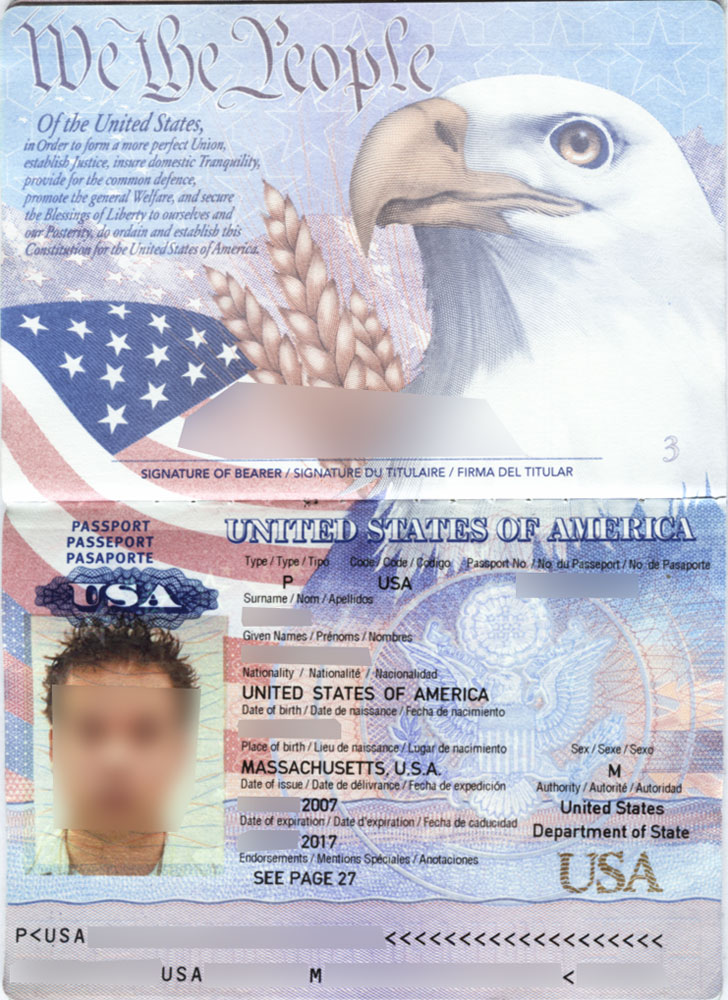
US adult passport with ten-year validity

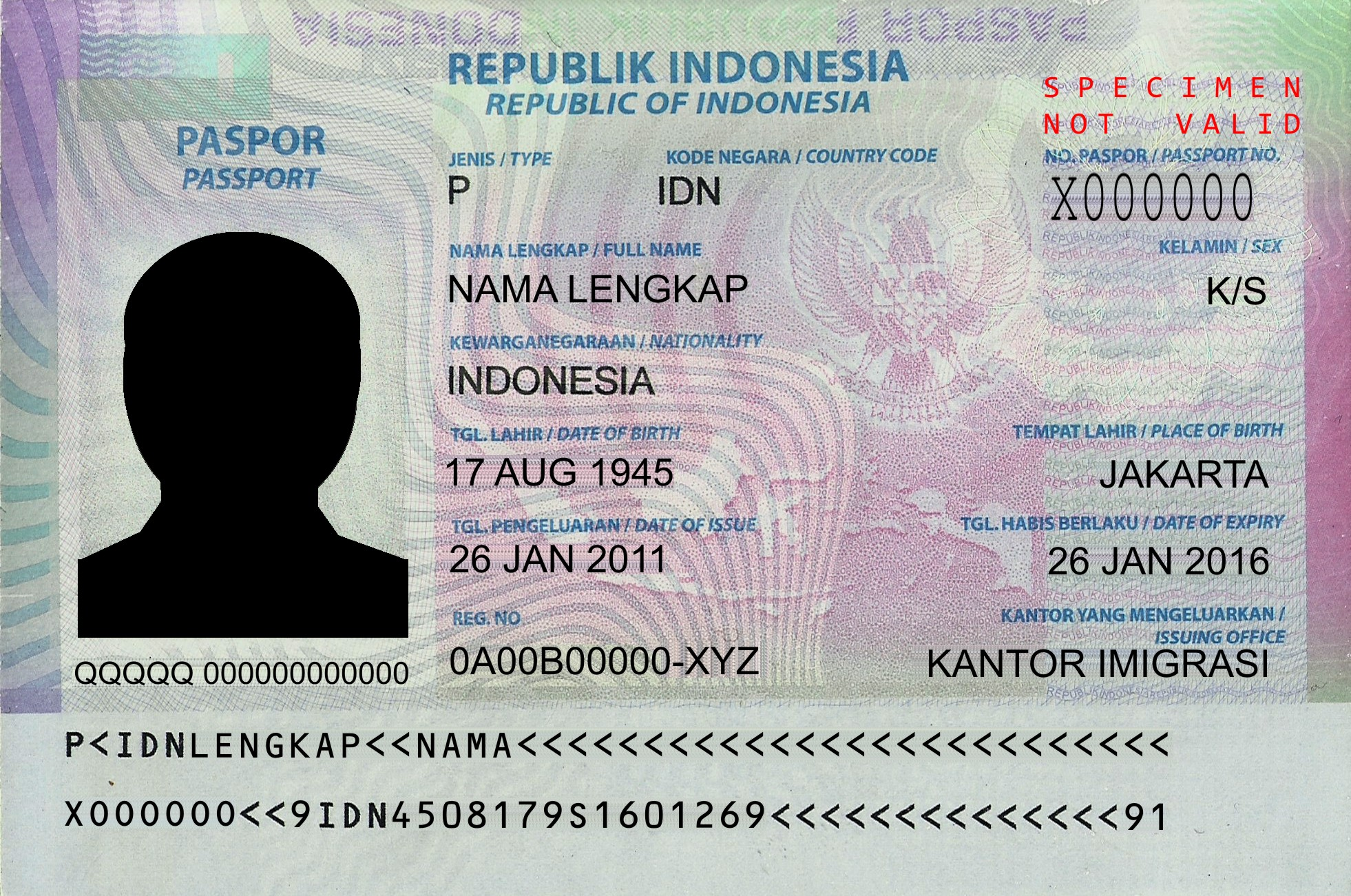
Indonesian adult passport with five-year validity

Old New Zealand passport showing the old validity period of five years

There is an increasing trend for adult passports to be valid for ten years, such as a United Kingdom passport, United States passport, New Zealand passport (after 30 November 2015) or Australian passport. A five year period of validity is also common as used to be the situation for a Papua New Guinean passport.

Some countries issue adult passports for periods between five and ten years, such as the Cuban passport, which is valid for six years.

Unless otherwise limited, US adult passports in the late 20th century used to expire three years after their issue date, or after 5 years if they had been renewed.

=== Optional validity period ===
Some countries allow adult applicants to choose a passport validity, usually 5 or 10 years, at a varying price scale, e.g. costing more for 10 years than 5 years. These countries include Canada, Hungary, Japan, Mexico (1, 3, 6, or 10), Pakistan, Russia, South Korea, Turkey and Bangladesh.

=== Child and young adult passports ===
Most countries issue passports for children and young adults for five years, under passport issuing protocols a child or young adult passport is defined as being under 16 years for a United States passport, under 19 years for a Japanese passport, under 21 years for a Croatian passport, under 24 years for a German passport or under 30 years as is the case with a Spanish passport.

=== Infant passports ===
Because children change rapidly in appearance from infancy to age five, some countries issue infant passports for two years, such as the Austrian passport, or for one year in the case of the Republic of Korea passport.

=== Country-by-country passport validity requirements ===
Some countries base validity on arrival date and some require passports to be valid beyond the intended departure date.

=== Validity on arrival ===
Many countries require passports to have a remaining validity of six months or more on the date of arrival.

Countries requiring passport validity of at least 6 months on arrival include Afghanistan, Algeria, Bhutan, Botswana, Brunei, Cambodia, Canada, Comoros, Côte d'Ivoire, Ecuador, Egypt, El Salvador, Fiji, Guyana, Indonesia, Iran, Iraq (except when arriving at Basra - 3 months and Erbil or Sulaimaniyah - on arrival), Kenya, Laos, Madagascar, Malaysia, Marshall Islands, Mexico, Myanmar, Namibia, Nicaragua, Nigeria, Oman, Palau, Papua New Guinea, Rwanda, Saint Lucia, Samoa, Saudi Arabia, Singapore, Solomon Islands, Sri Lanka, Suriname, Taiwan, Tanzania, Thailand, Timor-Leste, Tonga, Turkey, Tuvalu, Uganda, Vanuatu, Venezuela, and Vietnam.

Countries requiring passport validity of at least 4 months on arrival include Micronesia and Zambia.

Countries requiring passport validity of at least 3 months on arrival include Georgia, Honduras, Iceland, Jordan, Kuwait, Lebanon, Moldova, Nauru, Panama, and the United Arab Emirates.

Countries requiring passport validity of at least 1 month on arrival include Philippines, Eritrea, Hong Kong, Macao, and South Africa.

Schengen Area countries have some very particular requirements for both arrival and departure. On arrival passports must have been issued less than 10 years prior. UK passports issued before 2018 could potentially be valid for up to 10 years and 8 months. The 10-year issue rule effectively reduces UK passports to a maximum validity of 10 years 3 months or less, depending on the intended length of stay. It is safer to calculate based on 10 years maximum, rather than the actual expiry. All UK passports valid longer than 10 years should be renewed at or before the 10-year anniversary to avoid problems travelling in the Schengen Area.

Other countries require either a passport valid on arrival or passport valid throughout the period of intended stay or potentially need to be valid beyond departure date.

=== Validity on departure ===
Countries requiring validity of at least 3 months after intended departure include Schengen Area countries.

New Zealand has two rules. Passports must be valid for 3 months beyond departure. This is relaxed to 1 month where there is an embassy or consulate within New Zealand capable of issuing replacement passports.

=== Passport validity in years ===
- Afghanistan: 5
- Albania: 10
- Algeria: 10
- Andorra: 10
- Angola: 5
- Antigua and Barbuda: 5 or 10
- Argentina: 10
- Armenia: 10
- Australia: 10
- Austria: 10
- Azerbaijan: 10
- Bahamas: 10
- Bahrain: 5
- Bangladesh: 5 or 10
- Barbados: 10
- Belarus: 10
- Belgium: 7
- Belize: 10
- Benin: 5
- Bhutan: 10
- Bolivia: 6
- Bosnia and Herzegovina: 10
- Botswana: 10
- Brazil: 10
- Brunei Darussalam: 5
- Bulgaria: 5 or 10
- Burkina Faso: 5
- Burundi: 5
- Cabo Verde: 5
- Cambodia: 10
- Canada: 5 or 10
- Central African Republic: 5
- Chad: 5
- Chile: 10
- China: 10
- Colombia: 10
- Comoros: 5
- Congo: 5
- Costa Rica: 10
- Côte d'Ivoire: 5
- Croatia: 5^{1} or 10
- Cuba: 6
- Cyprus: 10
- Czech Republic: 10
- Democratic Republic of the Congo: 5
- Denmark: 10
- Djibouti: 5
- Dominica: 10
- Dominican Republic: 6 or 10
- Ecuador: 10
- Egypt: 7
- El Salvador: 5
- Equatorial Guinea: 5
- Eritrea: 10
- Estonia: 10
- Ethiopia: 5
- Fiji: 10
- Finland: 5
- France: 10
- Gabon: 10
- Gabon: 5
- Georgia: 10
- Germany: 6 or 10
- Ghana: 5
- Greece: 10
- Grenada: 5
- Guatemala: 5
- Guinea: 5
- Guinea-Bissau: 5
- Guyana: 5
- Haiti: 10
- Honduras: 5
- Hungary: 5 or 10
- Iceland: 10
- India: 5 or 10
- Indonesia: 10
- Iran: 5
- Iraq: 4 or 8
- Ireland: 10
- Israel: 10
- Italy: 10
- Jamaica: 5 or 10
- Japan: 5 or 10
- Jordan: 5
- Kazakhstan: 10
- Kenya: 10
- Kiribati: 10
- Kosovo: 10
- Kuwait: 5 or 10
- Kyrgyzstan: 10
- Laos: 10
- Latvia: 10
- Lebanon: 5 or 10
- Lesotho: 10
- Liberia: 5
- Liechtenstein: 10
- Lithuania: 10
- Luxembourg: 5, changing to 10 from 11 May 2026
- Macedonia: 10
- Madagascar: 10
- Malawi: 10
- Malaysia: 5 or 10
- Maldives: 5
- Mali: 5
- Malta: 10
- Marshall Islands: 5
- Mauritania: 5
- Mauritius: 10
- Mexico: 3, 6, or 10 (adult)
- Moldova: 10
- Monaco: 5
- Mongolia: 10
- Montenegro: 10
- Morocco: 5
- Mozambique: 5
- Myanmar: 5
- Namibia: 10
- Nauru: 10
- Nepal: 10
- Netherlands: 10
- New Zealand: 5 or 10
- Nicaragua: 5 or 10
- Nigeria: 5
- North Korea: 5
- Norway: 10
- Oman: 10
- Pakistan: 5 or 10
- Palestine: 5
- Panama: 5
- Papua New Guinea: 5
- Paraguay: 5
- Peru: 10
- Philippines: 10
- Poland: 10
- Portugal: 5
- Qatar: 5
- Romania: 10
- Russian Federation: 5 or 10
- Rwanda: 5 or 10
- Saint Kitts and Nevis: 10
- Saint Lucia: 5
- Saint Vincent and the Grenadines: 10
- Samoa: 10
- San Marino: 10
- São Tomé and Príncipe: 5–10 years
- Saudi Arabia: 5 or 10 (lunar years)
- Senegal: 5
- Serbia: 10
- Seychelles: 5
- Sierra Leone: 5
- Singapore: 10
- Slovakia: 10
- Slovenia: 10
- Solomon Islands: 10
- Somalia: 5
- South Africa: 10
- South Korea: 5 or 10
- South Sudan: 5
- Spain: 5^{1} or 10
- Sri Lanka: 10
- Sudan: 10
- Suriname: 10
- Suriname: 5
- Swaziland: 10
- Sweden: 5
- Switzerland: 10
- Syria: 6
- Tajikistan: 10
- Tanzania: 10
- Thailand: 5 or 10
- Timor-Leste: 10
- Tonga: 10
- Trinidad and Tobago: 5 or 10
- Tunisia: 5
- Turkey: 5 or 10
- Turkmenistan: 10
- Uganda: 10
- Ukraine: 10
- United Arab Emirates: 5
- United Kingdom: 10
- United States: 10
- Uzbekistan: 10
- Vanuatu: 10
- Vatican: 10
- Venezuela: 5 or 10
- Vietnam: 10
- Yemen: 6
- Zambia: 10
- Zimbabwe: 10
