= Visa requirements for New Zealand citizens =

Administrative entry restrictions

Visa requirements for New Zealand citizens are administrative entry restrictions by the authorities of other states placed on citizens of New Zealand.

As of 2026, New Zealand citizens have visa-free or visa on arrival access to 183 countries and territories, ranking the New Zealand passport 7th in the world according to the Henley Passport Index.

== Visa requirements map ==
Visa requirements for New Zealand citizens holding ordinary passports New Zealand Trans-Tasman Travel Arrangement Visa not required / ESTA / ETA Visa on arrival eVisa Visa available both on arrival or online Visa required

== Visa requirements ==
Country / Region	Visa requirement	Allowed stay	Notes (excluding departure fees)	Reciprocity
Afghanistan	eVisa	30 days	e-Visa : Visitors must arrive at Kabul International (KBL).; The New Zealand government advises its citizens not to travel to Afghanistan due to the hostile and unpredictable security situation, high and ongoing threat of terrorism and kidnapping of foreigners.	No
Albania	Visa not required	90 days		No
Algeria	Visa required		Persons may be denied entry if entering with a passport containing visas or stamps issued by Israel.; Visitors on tours organized to some southern regions by an approved travel agency may obtain a visa on arrival for up to 30 days.	Yes
Andorra	Visa not required			Yes
Angola	Visa not required	30 days	30 days per trip, but no more than 90 days within any 1 calendar year for tourism purposes only.; Visitors must have a return/onward ticket and a hotel reservation confirmation.; An International Certificate of Vaccination is required.	No
Antigua and Barbuda	Visa not required	6 months		No
Argentina	Visa not required	90 days		Yes
Armenia	Visa not required	180 days		No
Australia	Visa not required	Indefinitely	New Zealand citizens travelling on a New Zealand passport may be granted a Special Category Visa on arrival entitling the holder to live, work and study indefinitely (pursuant to the Trans-Tasman Travel Arrangement), provided that they are not assessed as either a Behaviour-concern non-citizen or a Health-concern non-citizen.; May enter using SmartGate.	Yes
Austria	Visa not required	90 days	90 days within any 180 day period in the Schengen Area.	Yes
Azerbaijan	eVisa	30 days	New Zealanders with a residence visa issued by the United Arab Emirates may obtain a 30-day tourist visa on arrival in Azerbaijan. They must present their valid visa or residence permit along with their passport.	No
Bahamas	Visa not required	3 months		No
Bahrain	eVisa / Visa on arrival	14 days		Yes
Bangladesh	Visa on arrival	30 days	Not available at all entry points.	No
Barbados	Visa not required	6 months		No
Belarus	Visa not required / eVisa	30 days	The New Zealand government advises its citizens not to travel to Belarus due to the volatile security situation caused by the Russian military action in neighbouring Ukraine and the conducting of military operations by Russian forces from Belarus. New Zealanders in Belarus should leave immediately if they judge it is safe to do so.; e-Visa can be issued for 30 days and can be used at all international checkpoints, including road and rail.	No
Belgium	Visa not required	90 days	90 days within any 180 day period in the Schengen Area.	Yes
Belize	Visa not required			No
Benin	eVisa	30 days	Must have an international vaccination certificate.; Three types of electronic visa are offered: the e-Visa valid for 30 days for a single entry (50 EUR), the e-Visa valid for 30 days for several (multiple) entries (75 EUR), and the e-Visa valid for 90 days to make several (multiple) entries (100 EUR).	No
Bhutan	eVisa	90 days	The Sustainable Development Fee (SDF) of 200 USD per person, per night for almost all visitors to Bhutan. Additionally, if payment is made in US dollars from September 1, 2023 to August 31, 2027, the SDF is 100 USD.	No
Bolivia	Visa not required	90 days		No
Bosnia and Herzegovina	Visa not required	90 days	90 days within any 6-month period.	No
Botswana	Visa not required	90 days	90 days within any year period.	No
Brazil	Visa not required	90 days		Yes
Brunei	Visa not required	30 days		Yes
Bulgaria	Visa not required	90 days	90 days within any 180 day period in the Schengen Area.	Yes
Burkina Faso	eVisa		The New Zealand government advises its citizens not to travel to Burkina Faso due to the volatile security situation and the high threat of kidnapping, terrorism and armed banditry.	No
Burundi	Online Visa / Visa on arrival	1 month	From December 2021, passengers of all countries that required visa, can now obtain visa on arrival at Bujumbura International Airport, and all land borders.	No
Cambodia	eVisa / Visa on arrival	30 days		No
Cameroon	eVisa			No
Canada	eTA / Visa not required	6 months	eTA required if arriving by air.; Also, an eTA not required when arriving by car, bus, train or boat (including a cruise ship).	Yes
Cape Verde	Visa on arrival	30 days	Not available at all entry points.	No
Central African Republic	Visa required		The New Zealand government advises its citizens not to travel to the Central African Republic due to the unstable security situation, activities of armed rebel groups and the high level of violent crime.	Yes
Chad	eVisa			Yes
Chile	Visa not required	90 days		Yes
China	Visa not required	30 days	Visa-free from 1 July 2024 to 31 December 2026.; 240-hour (10-day) visa-free transit to a third country or region (including Hong Kong, Macau or Taiwan) using any mode of transport. Must have a confirmed onward ticket/itinerary, and enter through 1 of 64 approved ports.; During which, may freely travel within the 24 provinces permitted for visa-free transit and engage in tourism, business, and visits.; 24-hour visa-free transit to a third country or region (including Hong Kong, Macau, and Taiwan), is available at most international airports, without leaving the airport.; Travellers who need to leave the airport may obtain a temporary entry permit from immigration.; 5-day port visa (Visa on Arrival) for Shenzhen if arriving at designated ports of entry from Hong Kong by land or sea, for stays within Shenzhen.; 3-day port visa (Visa on Arrival) if arriving in Zhuhai or Xiamen at designated ports of entry, for stays within the respective city.; 15-day visa-free entry for cruise ship passengers in tour groups, if arriving at any cruise port along China's coastline, including but not limited to Tianjin; Dalian; Shanghai; Lianyungang; Wenzhou; Zhoushan; Xiamen; Qingdao; Guangzhou; Shenzhen; Beihai; Haikou; Sanya. May further travel inland to all regions of coastal provinces (and equivalents) and Beijing.; May apply for a port visa (Visa on Arrival) if travelling for an urgent, qualified reason. Prior clearance for port visa is highly recommended or may be denied boarding by airlines.	X
Colombia	Visa not required	90 days	90 days - extendable up to 180-days stay within a one-year period	No
Comoros	Visa on arrival	45 days		No
Republic of the Congo	Visa required			No
Democratic Republic of the Congo	eVisa	7 days	The New Zealand government advises its citizens not to travel to Democratic Republic of the Congo (DRC) due to the unstable security situation, ongoing armed conflict, terrorism and violent crime.	No
Costa Rica	Visa not required	90 days		No
Côte d'Ivoire	eVisa	3 months	e-Visa holders must arrive via Port Bouet Airport.	No
Croatia	Visa not required	90 days	90 days within any 180 day period in the Schengen Area.	Yes
Cuba	eVisa	90 days		No
Cyprus	Visa not required	90 days	90 days within any 180 day period.	Yes
Czech Republic	Visa not required	90 days	90 days within any 180 day period in the Schengen Area.	Yes
Denmark	Visa not required	90 days	90 days within any 180 day period in the Schengen Area regardless of previous time spent in other Schengen countries (except the other Nordic countries).	Yes
Djibouti	eVisa	90 days		No
Dominica	Visa not required	6 months		No
Dominican Republic	Visa not required	30 days	Can be extended up to 120 days with fee	No
Ecuador	Visa not required	90 days		No
Egypt	eVisa / Visa on arrival	30 days	Visa-on-arrival costs 30 USD for single entry visa (Tourism).	No
El Salvador	Visa not required	180 days		No
Equatorial Guinea	eVisa	30 days		No
Eritrea	Visa required			Yes
Estonia	Visa not required	90 days	90 days within any 180 day period in the Schengen Area.	Yes
Eswatini	Visa not required	30 days		No
Ethiopia	Online Visa / Visa on arrival	90 days	Visa on arrival is obtainable only at Addis Ababa Bole International Airport.; e-Visa holders must arrive via Addis Ababa Bole International Airport.; e-Visa is available for 30 or 90 days.	No
Fiji	Visa not required	4 months		No
Finland	Visa not required	90 days	90 days within any 180 day period in the Schengen Area.	Yes
France	Visa not required	90 days	90 days within any 180 day period in the Schengen Area (in Regions of France).	Yes
Gabon	eVisa	90 days	e-Visa holders must arrive via Libreville International Airport.	No
Gambia	Visa not required	90 days		No
Georgia	Visa not required	1 year		No
Germany	Visa not required	90 days	90 days within any 180 day period in the Schengen Area.	Yes
Ghana	Visa required			Yes
Greece	Visa not required	90 days	90 days within any 180 day period in the Schengen Area.	Yes
Grenada	Visa not required	3 months		No
Guatemala	Visa not required	90 days		No
Guinea	eVisa	90 days		No
Guinea-Bissau	Visa on arrival	90 days		No
Guyana	Visa not required	90 days		Yes
Haiti	Visa not required	3 months	The New Zealand government advises its citizens not to travel to Haiti due to the high level of kidnapping, violent crime and civil unrest.	No
Honduras	Visa not required	90 days		No
Hungary	Visa not required	90 days	90 days within any 180 day period in the Schengen Area.	Yes
Iceland	Visa not required	90 days	90 days within any 180 day period in the Schengen Area.	Yes
India	eVisa	30 days	e-Visa holders must arrive via 32 designated airports (Note: Ahmedabad; Amritsar; Bagdogra; Bengaluru; Bhubaneswar; Chandigarh; Chennai; Coimbatore; Delhi; Gaya; Goa-Dabolim; Goa-Manohar; Guwahati; Hyderabad; Indore; Jaipur; Kannur; Kochi; Kolkata; Kozhikode; Lucknow; Madurai; Mangaluru; Mumbai; Nagpur; Port Blair; Pune; Surat; Thiruvananthapuram; Tiruchirappalli; Varanasi; Visakhapatnam) or 5 designated seaports. (Note: Chennai; Cochin; Mormugao (Goa); Mumbai; Mangalore); An Indian e-Tourist Visa may only be obtained twice within 1 calendar year.; Foreigners of Pakistani origin or who hold a Pakistani Passport are not eligible for an e-Visa. Foreigners who are not Pakistani nationals, but whose parents or grandparents (either paternal or maternal) were born in, or were permanent residents in Pakistan, are also not eligible for an e-Visa.	No
Indonesia	e-VOA / Visa on arrival	30 days	Visa on arrival is extendable up to 60 days.	No
Iran	eVisa	30 days	The New Zealand government advises its citizens not to travel to Iran due to the potential for violent civil unrest, the risk of arrest or detention and the volatile security situation in the region.	No
Iraq	eVisa	30 days	The New Zealand government advises its citizens not to travel to Iraq (including the Kurdistan region) due to the volatile and unpredictable security situation, the ongoing thread of terrorism, violent extremism and organised crime.	No
Ireland	Visa not required	90 days		Yes
Israel	Electronic Travel Authorization	90 days	Entry refused to anyone who "knowingly issues a public call for boycotting Israel."	Yes
Italy	Visa not required	90 days	90 days within any 180 day period in the Schengen Area.	Yes
Jamaica	Visa not required			No
Japan	Visa not required	90 days		Yes
Jordan	eVisa / Visa on arrival	30 days	Visa can be obtained upon arrival, it will cost a total of 40 JOD, obtainable at most international ports of entry and land border crossings. (except King Hussein/Allenby Bridge)	No
Kazakhstan	Visa not required	30 days		No
Kenya	Electronic Travel Authorisation	90 days	Applications can be submitted up to 90 days prior to travel and must be submitted at least 3 days in advance.; eTA fee is 32.50 USD.; Proof of reservation at the hotel where visitors plan to stay is required (if staying with friends, an invitation letter is also acceptable).; Yellow fever vaccination certificate is required if coming from endemic countries.; Can also be entered on an East Africa tourist visa issued by Rwanda or Uganda.	No
Kiribati	Visa not required	90 days	90 days in any calendar year period.	No
North Korea	Visa required		The New Zealand government advises its citizens not to travel to North Korea due to extensive restrictions placed on foreigners and an uncertain security situation that can change with little warning.	Yes
South Korea	Electronic Travel Authority	90 days	The validity period of a K-ETA is 3 years from the date of approval.; Exempted from the K-ETA requirement until 31 December 2026.	Yes
Kuwait	eVisa / Visa on arrival	3 months	The New Zealand government advises its citizens not to travel to Kuwait due to the ongoing conflict in the middle east.	Yes
Kyrgyzstan	Visa not required	30 days	A single or multiple tourist or business e-visa for 90 days is also available.	No
Laos	eVisa / Visa on arrival	30 days	18 (Note: Savannakhet Airport; Lanetoui - Mengkang (China); Meuangmom - Wan Pong (Myanmar); Banvang - Ban Khok Phai (Thailand); Namngeun - Huay Kon (Thailand); Paksan - Bueng Kan (Thailand); Paktaphan - Pak Saeng (Thailand); Pangmon - Ban Huak (Thailand); Phoudou (Thailand); Dak ta ock - Nam Giang (Vietnam); La Lai (Vietnam); Namkan (Vietnam); Namphao - Cau Treo (Vietnam); Namsoy - Na Meo (Vietnam); Naphao - Cha Lo (Vietnam); Pahang - Long Sap (Vietnam); Panghok - Tây Trang (Vietnam); Phoukeua - Bo Y (Vietnam)) of the 33 border crossings are only open to regular visa holders.; e-Visa may be used to enter Laos through the Luang Prabang, Pakse and Vientiane international airports, 3 Thai-Lao Friendship Bridges (Note: Vientiane (Friendship Bridge 1); Savannakhet (Friendship Bridge 2); Bokeo (Friendship Bridge 4)), in Boten (road and railroad), and in Vientiane (at Khamsavath railway station).; Visa on arrival is available at the Luang Prabang, Pakse and Vientiane international airports, 4 Thai-Lao Friendship Bridges (Note: Vientiane (Friendship Bridge 1); Savannakhet (Friendship Bridge 2); Khammouane (Friendship Bridge 3); Bokeo (Friendship Bridge 4)) and 7 border crossings. (Note: Nongnokkheane - Trapeang Kriel (Cambodia); Boten - Bo han (China); Golden Triangle/Samliemkham (Thailand); Khamsavath railway station (Thailand); Namheuang - Ban Na Kraseng (Thailand); Vang tao - Chongmek (Thailand); Dansavan - Lao Bảo (Vietnam))	No
Latvia	Visa not required	90 days	90 days within any 180 day period in the Schengen Area.	Yes
Lebanon	Free visa on arrival	1 month	The New Zealand government advises its citizens not to travel to Lebanon due to the volatile security situation and the risk of the security situation deteriorating further.; Extendable for 2 additional months.; Granted free of charge at Beirut International Airport or any other port of entry if there is no Israeli visa or seal, holding a telephone number, an address in Lebanon, and a non refundable return or circle trip ticket.	No
Lesotho	Visa not required	14 days		No
Liberia	e-VOA	3 months	Currently available only upon arrival at the Roberts International Airport (ROB) in Monrovia.	Yes
Libya	eVisa		The New Zealand government advises its citizens not to travel to Libya due to ongoing conflict and the threat of terrorism and kidnapping. New Zealanders currently in Libya are strongly advised to depart immediately.	No
Liechtenstein	Visa not required	90 days	90 days within any 180 day period in the Schengen Area.	Yes
Lithuania	Visa not required	90 days	90 days within any 180 day period in the Schengen Area.	Yes
Luxembourg	Visa not required	90 days	90 days within any 180 day period in the Schengen Area.	Yes
Madagascar	eVisa / Visa on arrival	90 days	For stays of 61 to 90 days, the visa fee is 59 USD.	No
Malawi	eVisa / Visa on arrival	30 days		No
Malaysia	Visa not required	90 days		Yes
Maldives	Free visa on arrival	30 days		No
Mali	Visa required		The New Zealand government advises its citizens not to travel to Mali due to the unpredictable security situation, the threat of terrorism and risk of kidnapping and armed banditry.	Yes
Malta	Visa not required	90 days	90 days within any 180 day period in the Schengen Area.	Yes
Marshall Islands	Visa on arrival	90 days		No
Mauritania	eVisa	30 days	Available at Nouakchott–Oumtounsy International Airport.	No
Mauritius	Visa not required	180 days	180 days per calendar year for tourism, 120 days per calendar year for tourism	Yes
Mexico	Visa not required	180 days		Yes
Micronesia	Visa not required	30 days		No
Moldova	Visa not required	90 days	90 days within any 180 day period.	No
Monaco	Visa not required			Yes
Mongolia	Visa not required	30 days	The Ministry of Foreign Affairs of Mongolia has exempted visas for 34 countries from January 2023 to December 2026.	No
Montenegro	Visa not required	90 days		No
Morocco	Visa not required	3 months		No
Mozambique	eVisa / Visa on arrival	30 days	Travelers must pay a fee of 190 USD upon entry.	No
Myanmar	eVisa	30 days	The New Zealand government advises its citizens not to travel to Myanmar due to ongoing civil unrest and armed conflict.	No
Namibia	eVisa / Visa on arrival	3 months / 90 days		No
Nauru	Visa required		Free visa on arrival for Cook Islands and Niue residents.	Yes
Nepal	Online Visa / Visa on arrival	90 days		No
Netherlands	Visa not required	90 days	90 days within any 180 day period in the Schengen Area (European Netherlands).	Yes
Nicaragua	eVisa		The country launched the electronic visa portal in March 2026.	Yes
Niger	Visa required		The New Zealand government advises its citizens not to travel to Niger due to the threat of terrorism and kidnapping, the presence of armed militants and the unpredictable security situation.	Yes
Nigeria	eVisa	30 days		No
North Macedonia	Visa not required	90 days	90 days within any 180 day period.	No
Norway	Visa not required	90 days	90 days within any 180 day period in the Schengen Area.	Yes
Oman	Visa not required / eVisa	14 days / 3 months	Issued free of charge.	Yes
Pakistan	eVisa	3 months		No
Palau	Free visa on arrival	30 days		No
Panama	Visa not required	90 days		No
Papua New Guinea	Easy Visitor Permit	60 days	Available at Gurney Airport (Alotau), Mount Hagen Airport, Port Moresby Airport and Tokua Airport (Rabaul).	No
Paraguay	Visa not required	90 days		No
Peru	Visa not required	90 days		No
Philippines	Visa not required	30 days		No
Poland	Visa not required	90 days	90 days within any 180 day period in the Schengen Area.	Yes
Portugal	Visa not required	90 days	90 days within any 180 day period in the Schengen Area.	Yes
Qatar	Visa not required	30 days		Yes
Romania	Visa not required	90 days	90 days within any 180 day period in the Schengen Area.	Yes
Russia	Visa required		The New Zealand government advises its citizens not to travel to Russia due to the impacts the armed conflict with Ukraine has had on commercial flight availability and access to financial services. There is also potential for the security situation to deteriorate with little warning.	Yes
Rwanda	Visa not required	30 days	Can also be entered on an East Africa Tourist Visa issued by Kenya or Uganda.	No
Saint Kitts and Nevis	Electronic Travel Authorisation	3 months		No
Saint Lucia	Visa not required	6 weeks		No
Saint Vincent and the Grenadines	Visa not required	3 months		No
Samoa	Entry permit on arrival	90 days		No
San Marino	Visa not required			Yes
São Tomé and Príncipe	eVisa			No
Saudi Arabia	eVisa / Visa on arrival	90 days	The New Zealand government advises its citizens not to travel to Saudi Arabia due to the ongoing conflict in the middle east.	Yes
Senegal	Visa on arrival	90 days		No
Serbia	Visa not required	90 days	90 days within any 6-month period.	No
Seychelles	Electronic Border System	3 months	Application can be submitted up to 30 days before travel.; Visitors must upload a reservation confirmation(s) for each visitor's location of stay in Seychelles.; Yellow fever vaccination certificate is required if coming from endemic countries.; Payment of the fee (EUR 10) by credit or debit card.; Valid for one journey only and it expires once exit the country.	Yes
Sierra Leone	eVisa / Visa on arrival	3 months / 30 days		No
Singapore	Visa not required	90 days		Yes
Slovakia	Visa not required	90 days	90 days within any 180 day period in the Schengen Area.	Yes
Slovenia	Visa not required	90 days	90 days within any 180 day period in the Schengen Area.	Yes
Solomon Islands	Free Visitor's permit on arrival	3 months		No
Somalia	eVisa	30 days	The New Zealand government advises its citizens not to travel to Somalia, including Somaliland due to significant threat from terrorism, kidnapping, armed conflict and a high level of violent crime throughout the country. New Zealanders currently in Somalia are advised to leave.	No
South Africa	Visa not required	90 days		No
South Sudan	eVisa		The New Zealand government advises its citizens not to travel to South Sudan due to ongoing armed conflict, inter-ethnic violence and violent crime.; Obtainable online 30 days single entry for 100 USD, 90 days multiple entry for 200 USD and 180 days multiple entry for 350 USD.; Printed visa authorization must be presented at the time of travel.	No
Spain	Visa not required	90 days	90 days within any 180 day period in the Schengen Area.	Yes
Sri Lanka	Electronic Travel Authorisation	30 days	Free of charge	No
Sudan	Visa required		The New Zealand government advises its citizens not to travel to Sudan due to armed conflict, civil unrest, terrorism and kidnapping. New Zealanders who travel to Sudan against our advice should make sure they have appropriate security measures in place. You should also have a plan for departure if the security situation deteriorates.; Khartoum International Airport is closed and options for leaving Sudan are extremely limited. There may be ongoing disruptions to critical infrastructure and essential services.	Yes
Suriname	Visa not required	90 days	An entrance fee of USD 50 or EUR 50 must be paid online prior to arrival.; Multiple entry e-Visa is also available.	No
Sweden	Visa not required	90 days	90 days within any 180 day period in the Schengen Area.	Yes
Switzerland	Visa not required	90 days	90 days within any 180 day period in the Schengen Area.	Yes
Syria	eVisa		The New Zealand government advises its citizens not to travel to Syria due to the ongoing civil war and extremely dangerous security situation.	No
Tajikistan	Visa not required / eVisa	30 days / 60 days	e-Visa also available.; e-Visa holders can enter through all border points.	No
Tanzania	eVisa / Visa on arrival	90 days		No
Thailand	Visa not required	60 days		No
Timor-Leste	Visa on arrival	30 days	Not available at all entry points.	No
Togo	eVisa	15 days		No
Tonga	Free visa on arrival	31 days		No
Trinidad and Tobago	eVisa	90 days		No
Tunisia	Visa not required	3 months		No
Turkey	Visa not required	90 days		No
Turkmenistan	Visa required		10-day visa on arrival if holding a letter of invitation provided by a company registered in Turkmenistan with a prior approval from the Foreign Ministry. Visitors can apply to extend their stay for an additional 10 days.; When transiting between two non-bordering countries, visitors can obtain a Turkmenistan transit visa for a five-day stay. This must be applied for in advance at the Turkmenistan Embassy. Visitors must also submit copies of the visas for the country of entry into Turkmenistan and the country of departure from Turkmenistan. Visa fee is 20 USD.	Yes
Tuvalu	Visa on arrival	1 month		No
Uganda	eVisa	3 months	Can also be entered on an East Africa Tourist Visa issued by Kenya or Rwanda.	No
Ukraine	Visa not required	90 days	The New Zealand government advises its citizens not to travel to Ukraine due to Russia's invasion and ongoing military aggression.	No
United Arab Emirates	Visa not required	90 days		Yes
United Kingdom and Crown dependencies	Electronic Travel Authorisation	6 months	Visa also not required if holder has UK ancestry clearance visa.; Adults can use ePassport gates.	Yes
United States	Visa Waiver Program	90 days	ESTA is valid for 2 years from the date of issuance.; ESTA is also required when entering the country by cruise ship or land.; A Form I-94 is required for entry into the United States by land. It carries a $30 fee and can be obtained either online or upon arrival.; Visa required for nationals of VWP countries who have travelled or been present in Iran, Iraq, Libya, North Korea, Somalia, Sudan, Syria or Yemen at any time on or after 1 March 2011 or Cuba at any time on or after 12 January 2021, or nationals of VWP countries who are also nationals of Iran, Iraq, North Korea, Sudan or Syria. Exceptions apply if the travel was in military or diplomatic service of the VWP country.	Yes
Uruguay	Visa not required	90 days		Yes
Uzbekistan	Visa not required	30 days		No
Vanuatu	Visa not required	120 days		No
Vatican City	Visa not required			Yes
Venezuela	Visa not required	90 days	The New Zealand government advises its citizens not to travel to Venezuela due to the unstable political and economic situation, ongoing high levels of violent crime, the potential for violent civil unrest, and shortages of food, medicine and other basic supplies.	No
Vietnam	eVisa		30 days Visa free when visit Phu Quoc Island.; e-Visa is valid for 90 days and multiple entry.	No
Yemen	Visa required		The New Zealand government advises its citizens not to travel to Yemen (including the island of Socotra). The ongoing conflict and the extreme threat of terrorism and kidnapping presents a significant risk to New Zealanders in Yemen.; Yemen introduced an e-Visa system for visitors who meet certain eligibility requirements (group travel of 10 or more people, business trips, and transit etc.).	Yes
Zambia	Visa not required	30 days	Visa not required for Cook Islands and Niue residents.; Also eligible for a universal visa allowing access to Zimbabwe.	No
Zimbabwe	eVisa / Visa on arrival	1 month	Strictly tourism purposes only.; Also eligible for a universal visa allowing access to Zambia.	No

== Dependent and associated territories of New Zealand ==
NB: Cook Islands and Niue are not dependent territories of NZ, they are in Free Association with New Zealand

Territory	Conditions of access	Notes
Cook Islands	Visa not required	90 days
Niue	Visa not required	30 days
New Zealand Ross Dependency	Permit required	
Tokelau	Visa required	

== Dependent, disputed, or restricted territories ==
=== Unrecognised or partially recognised countries ===
Territory	Conditions of access	Notes
Abkhazia	Visa required	Tourists from all countries (except Georgia) can visit Abkhazia for a period not exceeding 24 hours as part of an organized tourist group.
Kosovo	Visa not required	90 days
Northern Cyprus	Visa not required	3 months
Palestine	Visa not required	The New Zealand government advises its citizens not to travel to Palestine due to the risk of armed conflicts, terrorism, and civil unrests.; Arrival by sea to Gaza Strip not allowed.
Sahrawi Arab Democratic Republic	Visa regime undefined	Undefined visa regime in the Western Sahara controlled territory.
Somaliland	Visa required	30 days for 30 USD, payable on arrival.
South Ossetia	Visa required	To enter South Ossetia, visitors must have a multiple-entry visa for Russia and register their stay with the Migration Service of the Ministry of Internal Affairs within 3 days.
Taiwan	Visa not required	90 days
Transnistria	Visa not required	Registration required after 24h.

=== Dependent and autonomous territories ===
Territory	Conditions of access	Notes
China
Hong Kong	Visa not required	90 days
Macau	Visa not required	90 days
Denmark
Faroe Islands	Visa not required	90 days
Greenland	Visa not required	90 days
France
French Guiana	Visa not required	90 days within 180 days
French Polynesia	Visa not required	90 days within 180 days
France French West Indies	Visa not required	Includes overseas departments of Guadeloupe and Martinique and overseas collectivities of Saint Barthélemy and Saint Martin.
Mayotte	Visa not required	90 days
New Caledonia	Visa not required	90 days
Réunion	Visa not required	90 days
Saint Pierre and Miquelon	Visa not required	90 days
Wallis and Futuna	Visa not required	90 days
Netherlands
Aruba	Visa not required	30 days, extendable to 180 days
Netherlands Caribbean Netherlands	Visa not required	90 days. Includes Bonaire, Sint Eustatius and Saba.
Curaçao	Visa not required	90 days
Sint Maarten	Visa not required	90 days
United Kingdom
Akrotiri and Dhekelia	Visa not required	Stays longer than 28 days per 12-month period require a permit.
Anguilla	Visa not required	3 months
Bermuda	Visa not required	Up to 6 months, decided on arrival
British Indian Ocean Territory	Special permit required	Special permit required.
British Virgin Islands	Visa not required	30 days, extensions possible
Cayman Islands	Visa not required	6 months
Falkland Islands	Visa not required	A visitor permit is normally issued as a stamp in the passport on arrival, The maximum validity period is 1 month.
Gibraltar	Visa not required	6 months
Montserrat	Visa not required	6 months
Pitcairn Islands	Visa not required	14 days visa free and landing fee USD 35 or tax of USD 5 if not going ashore.
Ascension Island	eVisa	3 months within any year period.
Saint Helena	Visa Free with Payment	
Tristan da Cunha	Permission required	Permission to land required for 15/30 pounds sterling for yacht/ship passenger for Tristan da Cunha Island or 20 pounds sterling for Gough Island, Inaccessible Island or Nightingale Islands.
South Georgia and the South Sandwich Islands	Permit required	Pre-arrival permit from the Commissioner required (72 hours/1 month for 110/160 pounds sterling).
Turks and Caicos Islands	Visa not required	90 days
United States
American Samoa	Electronic authorization	30 days
Guam	Visa not required	45 days
Northern Mariana Islands	Visa not required	45 days
Puerto Rico	Electronic System for Travel Authorization	Visa not required under the Visa Waiver Program, for 90 days on arrival from overseas for 2 years. ESTA required.
U.S. Virgin Islands	Electronic System for Travel Authorization	Visa not required under the Visa Waiver Program, for 90 days on arrival from overseas for 2 years. ESTA required.
Antarctica and adjacent islands
Special permits required for (Bouvet Island) , British Antarctic Territory, French Southern and Antarctic Lands, Argentine Antarctica, (Australia) Australian Antarctic Territory, (Antártica Chilena Province) Chilean Antarctic Territory, (Australia) Heard Island and McDonald Islands, (Norway) Peter I Island, (Norway) Queen Maud Land.

=== Other territories ===
Territory	Conditions of access	Notes
(Belarus) Brest and Grodno	Visa not required	Visa-free for 10 days
China; Hainan	Visa not required	30 days
China; Tibet Autonomous Region	TTP required	Tibet Travel Permit required (10 USD).
Crimea	Visa required	Visa issued by Russia is required.
Eritrea outside Asmara	Travel permit required	To travel in the rest of the country, a Travel Permit for Foreigners is required (20 Eritrean nakfa).
Galápagos	Pre-registration required	60 days; Visitors must pre-register to receive a 20 USD Transit Control Card (TCT).
Fiji; Lau Province	Special permission required	Special permission required.
France; Clipperton Island	Special permit required	Special permit required.
Greece; Mount Athos	Special permit required	Special permit required (4 days: 25 EUR for Orthodox visitors, 35 EUR for non-Orthodox visitors, 18 EUR for students). There is a visitors' quota: maximum 100 Orthodox and 10 non-Orthodox per day and women are not allowed.
India PAP/RAP	PAP/RAP required	Protected Area Permit (PAP) required for whole states of Nagaland and Sikkim and parts of states Manipur, Arunachal Pradesh, Uttaranchal, Jammu and Kashmir, Rajasthan, Himachal Pradesh. Restricted Area Permit (RAP) required for all of Andaman and Nicobar Islands and parts of Sikkim. Some of these requirements are occasionally lifted for a year.
Iran; Kish Island	Visa not required	The New Zealand government advises its citizens not to travel to Iran due to the ongoing conflict in the middle east.; Tourists for Kish Island do not require a visa.
Iraqi Kurdistan	eVisa	30 days; The New Zealand government advises its citizens not to travel to Iraq due to the ongoing conflict in the middle east.
Kazakhstan	Special permission required	Special permission required for the town of Baikonur and surrounding areas in Kyzylorda Oblast, and the town of Gvardeyskiy near Almaty.
North Korea outside Pyongyang	Special permit required	People are not allowed to leave the capital city, tourists can only leave the capital with a governmental tourist guide (no independent moving)
(Malaysia) Sabah and Sarawak	Visa not required	These states have their own immigration authorities and passport is required to travel to them, however the same visa applies.
Maldives outside Malé	Permission required	With the exception of the capital Malé, tourists are generally prohibited from visiting non-resort islands without the express permission of the Government of Maldives.
Norway; Jan Mayen	Permit required	Permit issued by the local police required for staying for less than 24 hours and permit issued by the Norwegian police for staying for more than 24 hours.
Norway; Svalbard	Visa not required	Unlimited Stay (Indefinite Stay).
Novorossiya	Restricted area	Crossing from Ukraine requires visit purpose to be explained to Ukrainian passport control on exit and those who entered from Russia are not allowed to proceed further into Ukraine.
Russia	Special authorization required	Several closed cities and regions in Russia require special authorization.
Sudan outside Khartoum	Travel permit required	All foreigners travelling more than 25 kilometres outside of Khartoum must obtain a travel permit.
Sudan; Darfur	Travel permit required	Separate travel permit is required.
Tajikistan; Gorno-Badakhshan Autonomous Province	OIVR permit required	OIVR permit required (15+5 Tajikistani Somoni) and another special permit (free of charge) is required for Lake Sarez.
United Nations UN Buffer Zone in Cyprus	Access Permit required	Access Permit is required for travelling inside the zone, except Civil Use Areas.
United Nations Korean Demilitarized Zone	Access restricted	Restricted zone.
United Nations UNDOF Zone and Ghajar	Access restricted	Restricted zone.
United States United States Minor Outlying Islands	Special permits required	Special permits required for Baker Island, Howland Island, Jarvis Island, Johnston Atoll, Kingman Reef, Midway Atoll, Palmyra Atoll and Wake Island.
Venezuela; Margarita Island	Visa not required	All visitors are fingerprinted.
Vietnam; Phú Quốc	Visa not required	30 days
Yemen outside Sanaa or Aden	Special permission required	Special permission needed for travel outside Sanaa or Aden.

== Additional rules ==
=== Visa exemptions for Schengen states ===
==== A stay in the Schengen Area as a whole of up to 3 months ====
New Zealand citizens are classified as 'Annex II' foreign nationals, and so are permitted to stay visa-free in the 26 member states of the Schengen Area as a whole — rather than each country individually — for a period not exceeding 3 months every 6 months.

==== A stay in the Schengen Area as a whole of more than 3 months (but no more than 3 months in any individual member state) ====
The New Zealand Government has signed bilateral visa waiver agreements with a number of the individual countries who are Schengen signatories, which allow New Zealand citizens to spend up to three months in the relevant country, without reference to time spent in other Schengen signatory states.

Since these agreements continue to remain valid despite the implementation of the Schengen agreement, the European Commission has confirmed that in practice if New Zealanders visit Schengen countries which have signed these types of bilateral agreements with New Zealand, then the terms of these agreements override the conditions normally imposed as a result of the Schengen visa exemption agreement.

New Zealand has individual bilateral visa waiver agreements with the following Schengen signatories:

- Austria
- Belgium
- Czech Republic
- Denmark
- Finland
- France
- Germany
- Greece
- Iceland
- Italy
- Luxembourg
- Netherlands
- Norway
- Portugal
- Spain
- Sweden
- Switzerland

Consequently, New Zealand citizens can visit the above Schengen member states visa-free for periods of up to 3 months in each country.

If, however, a New Zealand citizen then visits another Schengen state not included in the list above, the restriction of no more than 3 months out of a 6-month period in the Schengen area as a whole applies. Therefore, if a New Zealand citizen has already spent 3 months in one or more of the above Schengen countries, any visits to another Schengen country without a bilateral visa waiver agreement with New Zealand may lead to difficulties with local law enforcement agencies (e.g. being accused of having overstayed upon leaving a Schengen country which is not in the list above).

In addition, a New Zealand citizen who has already spent up to 3 months in other parts of the Schengen Area can enter Hungary and remain there for up to a further 90 days visa-free. Following the stay in Hungary, if 3 months has already spent elsewhere in the Schengen area, he/she must then leave the Schengen area from Hungary and go directly to a country outside the Schengen Area.

==== A stay in the Schengen Area as a whole of more than 3 months (and more than 3 months in an individual member state) ====
In general, any person who is not a European Union, European Economic Area or Swiss citizen and who wishes to stay in a Schengen member state for more than 3 months is required to obtain a national long-stay 'D' visa and/or a residence permit.

New Zealand citizens aged 18–30 (or 18–35 in some cases) are able to obtain a national long-stay 'D' visa and/or a residence permit from 19 Schengen member states on the basis of a working holiday (see below). Schengen member states also issue national long-stay 'D' visas and residence permits for other reasons to those fulfilling criteria laid out in their national immigration policies (e.g. skilled workers, students, au pair).

In general, the national long-stay 'D' visa/residence permit needs to be obtained in advance through the member state's embassy/consulate. However, some Schengen member states offer exceptions for New Zealand citizens.

Austria allows New Zealand citizens to enter the country without a visa and to apply for a temporary residence permit or a 'Red-White-Red Card' (issued to permanent immigrants) after arrival, rather than in advance through an Austrian embassy/consulate.

The Czech Republic allows New Zealand citizens to apply for a work visa under a special scheme known as a 'Green Card' (rather than a 'Blue Card' or work permit which is required by most non-EU citizens). The application for a Green Card can be lodged at any Czech embassy/consulate (or, in some circumstances, within the Czech Republic if the applicant is already resident there) and is usually processed within 60 days.

As of 24 June 2014, it is no longer possible to apply for a green card. This type of permit was replaced

Denmark permits New Zealand citizens intending to stay in the country for over 3 months to enter Denmark without a visa and to apply for a residence or work permit (excluding a working holiday residence permit) after arrival (whilst for many other non-EEA and Swiss citizens, an application for a residence permit and visa for a stay over 3 months must be lodged in advance at a Danish foreign mission). This is particularly useful as there is no Danish embassy or consulate in New Zealand that accepts residence or work permit applications - the nearest one is in Canberra in Australia.

Estonia permits New Zealand citizens to stay and work in Estonia for more than 90 days but less than 6 months as long as they obtain a category 'D' long-stay visa at a cost of €80 in advance at an Estonian foreign mission after the employer has completed a 'registration of short-term employment'. New Zealand citizens intending to stay and work in Estonia for more than 6 months can apply for a temporary residence permit for employment after arrival in the country.

Germany permits New Zealand citizens intending to stay in the country for over 3 months to enter without a visa and to apply for a residence permit after arrival (whilst for many other non-EEA and Swiss citizens, a residence permit and visa for a stay over 3 months must be applied for in advance at a German foreign mission).

Hungary allows New Zealand citizens who wish to stay for more than 90 days in the country to apply for a residence card from the regional directorate of the Office of Immigration and Nationality within 90 days of arrival and do not need to obtain a residence permit prior to arrival in Hungary (unlike most other non-EEA and Swiss foreign nationals). Family members (who are not New Zealand citizens) accompanying New Zealand citizens can apply for a residence permit after arriving in Hungary. For example, if a New Zealand citizen wishes to move to Hungary with her husband and her daughter (who are both Samoan citizens and not New Zealand citizens), all three of them can apply for a Hungarian residence permit after arriving in Hungary (although the husband and daughter will have to apply for a Schengen visa prior to travelling to Hungary).

Latvia permits new Zealand citizens intending to stay in the country for over 3 months as self-employed persons or as businesspersons to enter Latvia without a visa and to apply for a residence permit after arrival (whilst for many non-EEA and Swiss citizens, an application for a residence permit must be lodged in advance at a Latvian foreign mission).

Netherlands exempts New Zealand citizens from the requirement to obtain a Schengen category "D" visa (the visa issued for long term stays in The Netherlands of over 90 days, known in Dutch as the "MVV" visa) - an exemption which goes beyond the visa waiver afforded to most other non-EEA and non-Swiss foreign nationals who are usually only given a visa waiver of up to 90 days in a 180-day period.

Norway permits New Zealand citizens who have qualifications as a skilled worker to stay in the country without a visa for up to 6 months to seek employment as a skilled worker or a specialist (except as a religious leader/teacher or an ethnic cook), as long as they register with the police within 3 months of arriving in Norway.

Slovakia permits New Zealand citizens intending to stay in the country for over 3 months to enter Slovakia without a visa and to apply for a residence permit (excluding a working holiday residence permit) after arrival (whilst for many other non-EEA and Swiss citizens, an application for a residence permit and visa for a stay over 3 months must be lodged in advance at a Slovak foreign mission).

Switzerland offers New Zealand citizens a more generous visa exemption than that which Schengen rules normally provide for. Not only are New Zealand citizens able to spend 3 months visa-free in Switzerland, they can also stay for over 3 months (i.e. without time limit) without the need to apply for a visa. However, at a cantonal level, individual cantonal migration authorities may impose further requirements, such as the need to register for a residence permit, if a New Zealand citizen wants to take up employment or reside for over 3 months, in which case a residence permit must be applied for before entry to Switzerland.

=== Visa exemptions and requirements for the United Kingdom ===
New Zealand citizens are able to visit the United Kingdom for up to 6 months (or 3 months if they enter from Ireland) without the need to apply for a visa as long as they fulfil all of the following criteria:

- they do not work during their stay in the UK
- they must not register a marriage or register a civil partnership during their stay in the UK
- they are able to present evidence of sufficient money to fund their stay in the UK (if requested by the border inspection officer)
- they intend to leave the UK at the end of their visit and can meet the cost of their return or onward journey
- if under the age of 18, they can demonstrate evidence of suitable care arrangements and parental (or guardian's) consent for their stay in the UK

However, even though, strictly speaking, they are not required to apply for a visa if they satisfy all of the above criteria, New Zealand citizens who fall into any of the following categories have been strongly advised by the UK Border Agency (replaced by UK Visas and Immigration) to apply for a visa prior to travelling to the UK if:

- they have any unspent criminal convictions in any country
- they have previously been refused entry or breached the terms of any entry to the UK, or been deported or otherwise removed from the UK
- they have previously applied for a visa and been refused one
- they have been warned by a UK official that they should obtain a visa before travelling to the UK

New Zealand citizens who were born before 1983 and qualify for right of abode are able to live and work in the United Kingdom indefinitely.

New Zealand citizens with a grandparent born either in the United Kingdom, Channel Islands or Isle of Man at any time or in the Republic of Ireland on or before 31 March 1922 can apply for UK Ancestry Entry Clearance, which enables them to work in the UK for 5 years, after which they can apply to settle indefinitely.

New Zealand citizens aged 18 to 30 can apply for a Youth Mobility Scheme visa which allows them to pursue a working holiday in the UK for 2 years.

New Zealand citizens can study in the United Kingdom for up to 6 months as a student visitor without the need to apply for a visa as long as they do not work during this period. If attending a course which is longer than 6 months, New Zealand citizens can apply for a Tier 4 student visa in New Zealand or in the UK merely by completing the application form, quoting the Confirmation of Acceptance for Studies (CAS) reference number issued to them by their UK education provider and presenting evidence of care arrangements (if under the age of 18); they do not need to submit proof of sufficient funds, qualifications or English language ability (which most other foreign nationals need to demonstrate) as long as the UK education provider is recognised as a 'Highly Trusted' sponsor by the UK Border Agency. However, the UK Border Agency reserves the right to request such evidence in particular situations and New Zealand citizens must still present such evidence if applying for a Tier 4 student visa outside New Zealand or the UK.

New Zealand citizens who have been issued with a Tier 4 student visa (but not those who are in the UK as student visitors) can work in the UK for up to 20 hours per week during term-time and without time restrictions outside term-time.

=== Visa exemption for Australia ===
By virtue of the Trans-Tasman Travel Arrangement, New Zealand citizens are granted a Special Category Visa on arrival in Australia (which permits residence and work for an indefinite period) as long as:

- they present a valid New Zealand passport
- they have no criminal convictions
- they have no untreated tuberculosis
- they have not been deported, excluded or removed from any country

The same privilege is extended to Australian citizens and PR holders.

== APEC Business Travel Card ==
Full members of the scheme Transitional members (United States, Canada)

Holders of an APEC Business Travel Card (ABTC) travelling on business do not require a visa to the following countries:

- Australia^{2}
- Brunei^{2}
- Chile^{2}
- China^{4}
- Hong Kong^{4}
- Indonesia^{4}
- Japan^{2}
- Malaysia^{2}
- Mexico^{1}
- Papua New Guinea^{4}
- Peru^{2}
- Philippines^{4}
- Russia^{3}
- Singapore^{4}
- South Korea^{2}
- Taiwan^{2}
- Thailand^{2}
- Vietnam^{4}

_{1 - Up to 180 days}
_{2 - Up to 90 days}
_{3 - Up to 90 days in a period of 180 days}
_{4 - Up to 60 days}

The card must be used in conjunction with a passport and has the following advantages:

- No need to apply for a visa or entry permit to APEC countries, as the card is treated as such (except by Canada and United States)
- Undertake legitimate business in participating economies
- Expedited border crossing in all member economies, including transitional members

== Non-visa restrictions ==
=== Blank passport pages ===
Many countries require a minimum number of blank pages to be available in the passport being presented, typically one or two pages. Endorsement pages, which often appear after the visa pages, are not counted as being valid or available.

=== Vaccination ===
Cover of the new International Certificate of Vaccination issued by the Bureau of Quarantine in the Philippines since 2021

The African countries of Angola, Benin, Burkina Faso, Burundi, Cameroon, Central African Republic, Democratic Republic of the Congo, Republic of the Congo, Côte d'Ivoire, Gabon, Ghana, Guinea-Bissau, Mali, Niger, Sierra Leone and Togo, South Sudan and Uganda, along with French Guiana in South America, require all incoming passengers older than nine months to one year, to have a current International Certificate of Vaccination or Prophylaxis.

Some other countries require vaccination only if the passenger is coming from an infected area or has visited one recently or has transited for 12 hours in those countries: Algeria, Botswana, Cabo Verde, Chad, Djibouti, Egypt, Eswatini, Ethiopia, Gambia, Ghana, Guinea, Lesotho, Libya, Equatorial Guinea, Eritrea, Madagascar, Malawi, Mauritania, Mauritius, Mozambique, Namibia, Nigeria, Papua New Guinea, Seychelles, Somalia, South Africa, Sudan, Tunisia, Uganda, Tanzania, Zambia and Zimbabwe.

=== Passport validity length ===
Very few countries, such as Paraguay, just require a valid passport on arrival.

However many countries and groupings now require only an identity card – especially from their neighbours. Other countries may have special bilateral arrangements that depart from the generality of their passport validity length policies to shorten the period of passport validity required for each other's citizens or even accept passports that have already expired (but not been cancelled).

Some countries, such as Japan, Ireland and the United Kingdom, require a passport valid throughout the period of the intended stay.

In the absence of specific bilateral agreements, countries requiring passports to be valid for at least 6 more months on arrival include Afghanistan, Algeria, Anguilla, Bahrain, Bhutan, Botswana, British Virgin Islands, Brunei, Cambodia, Cameroon, Cape Verde, Cayman Islands, Central African Republic, Chad, Comoros, Costa Rica, Côte d'Ivoire, Curaçao, Ecuador, Egypt, El Salvador, Equatorial Guinea, Fiji, Gabon, Guinea Bissau, Guyana, Haiti, India, Indonesia, Iran, Iraq, Israel, Jordan, Kenya, Kiribati, Kuwait, Laos, Madagascar, Malaysia, Marshall Islands, Mongolia, Myanmar, Namibia, Nepal, Nicaragua, Nigeria, Oman, Palau, Papua New Guinea, Peru, Philippines, Qatar, Rwanda, Samoa, Saudi Arabia, Singapore, Solomon Islands, Somalia, Sri Lanka, Sudan, Suriname, Tanzania, Thailand, Timor-Leste, Tokelau, Tonga, Turkey, Tuvalu, Uganda, United Arab Emirates, Vanuatu, Venezuela, and Vietnam.

Countries requiring passports valid for at least 4 months on arrival include Micronesia and Zambia.

Countries requiring passports with a validity of at least 3 months beyond the date of intended departure include Azerbaijan, Bosnia and Herzegovina, Honduras, Montenegro, Nauru, Moldova and New Zealand. Similarly, the EEA countries of Iceland, Liechtenstein, Norway, all European Union countries (except Ireland) together with Switzerland also require 3 months validity beyond the date of the bearer's intended departure unless the bearer is an EEA or Swiss national.

Countries requiring passports valid for at least 3 months on arrival include Albania, North Macedonia, Panama, and Senegal.

Bermuda requires passports to be valid for at least 45 days upon entry.

Countries that require a passport validity of at least one month beyond the date of intended departure include Eritrea, Hong Kong, Lebanon, Macau, the Maldives and South Africa.

==== Maximum passport age ====
Countries of the Schengen area require non-EU passports to be less than 10 years old upon entry.

=== Criminal record ===
Some countries, including Australia, Canada, Fiji, New Zealand and the United States, routinely deny entry to non-citizens who have a criminal record, while others impose restrictions depending on the type of conviction and the length of the sentence.

=== Persona non grata ===
The government of a country can declare a diplomat persona non grata, banning them from entering the country or expelling them if they have already entered. In non-diplomatic use, the authorities of a country may also declare a foreigner persona non grata permanently or temporarily, usually because of unlawful activity.

=== Israeli stamps ===
Kuwait, Lebanon, Libya, and Yemen do not allow entry to people with passport stamps from Israel or whose passports have either a used or an unused Israeli visa, or where there is evidence of previous travel to Israel such as entry or exit stamps from neighbouring border posts in transit countries such as Jordan and Egypt.

To circumvent this Arab League boycott of Israel, the Israeli immigration services have now mostly ceased to stamp foreign nationals' passports on either entry to or exit from Israel (unless the entry is for some work-related purposes). Since 15 January 2013, Israel no longer stamps foreign passports at Ben Gurion Airport. Passports are still (as of 22 June 2017) stamped at Erez when passing into and out of Gaza.

Iran refuses admission to holders of passports containing an Israeli visa or stamp that is less than 12 months old.

=== Biometrics ===
Several countries mandate that all travellers, or all foreign travellers, be fingerprinted on arrival and will refuse admission to or even arrest travellers who refuse to comply. In some countries, such as the United States, this may apply even to transit passengers who merely wish to change planes rather than go landside.

Fingerprinting countries/regions include Afghanistan, Argentina, Brunei, Cambodia, China, Ethiopia, Ghana, Guinea, India, Japan, Kenya (both fingerprints and a photo are taken), Malaysia upon entry and departure, Mongolia, Saudi Arabia, the Schengen Area, Singapore, South Korea, Taiwan, Thailand, Uganda, the United Arab Emirates and the United States.

Many countries also require a photo be taken of people entering the country. The United States, which does not fully implement exit control formalities at its land frontiers (although long mandated by its own legislation), intends to implement facial recognition for passengers departing from international airports to identify people who overstay their visa.

Together with fingerprint and face recognition, iris scanning is one of three biometric identification technologies internationally standardised since 2006 by the International Civil Aviation Organization (ICAO) for use in e-passports and the United Arab Emirates conducts iris scanning on visitors who need to apply for a visa. The United States Department of Homeland Security has announced plans to greatly increase the biometric data it collects at US borders. In 2018, Singapore began trials of iris scanning at three land and maritime immigration checkpoints.

== Consular protection of New Zealand citizens abroad ==
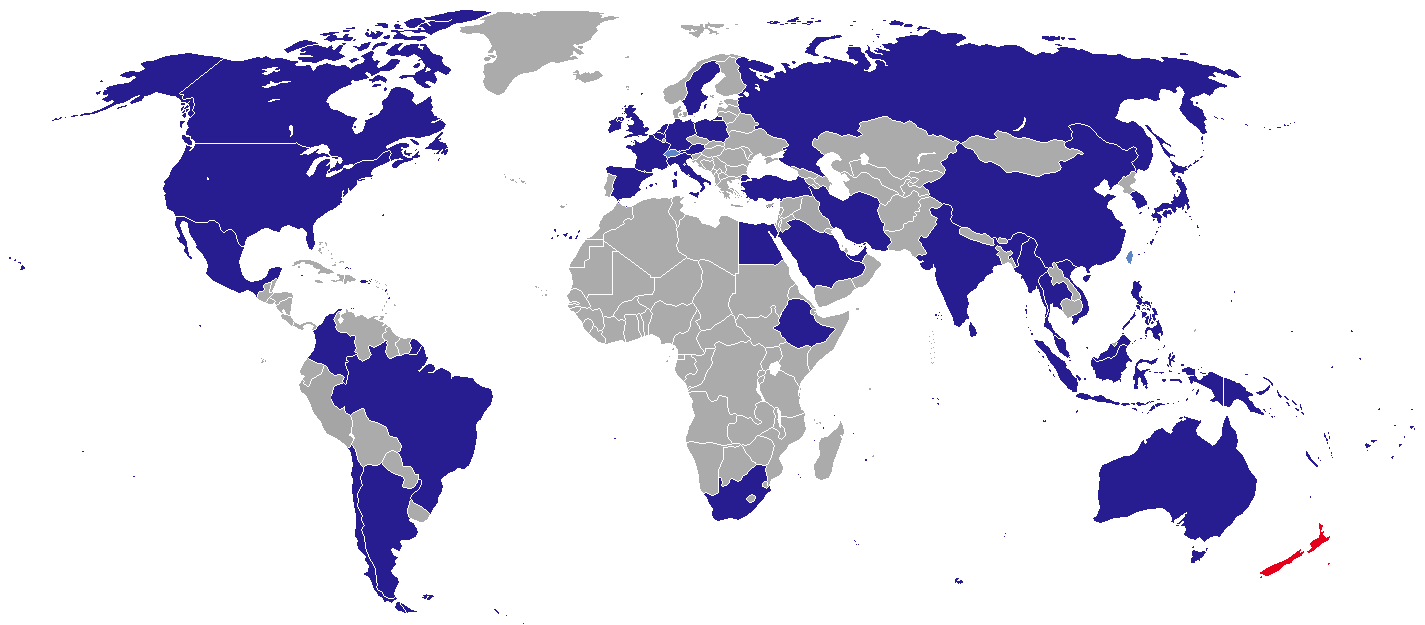
Diplomatic missions of New Zealand

== Foreign travel statistics ==
The following table shows New Zealand residents re-entering New Zealand during 2024 after an absence of less than 12 months, by the main country visited.

Foreign travel statistics
Destination	Number of New Zealand visitors
Australia	1,225,491
Cook Islands	108,590
Fiji	212,397
French Polynesia	8,977
New Caledonia	3,497
Niue	7,985
Samoa	67,212
Tonga	28,460
Vanuatu	13,207
Cambodia	5,374
China	150,140
Hong Kong	16,087
India	101,447
Indonesia	84,382
Japan	76,297
South Korea	25,133
Malaysia	23,370
Nepal	3,942
Pakistan	3,411
Philippines	47,889
Singapore	22,575
Sri Lanka	11,890
Taiwan	14,528
Thailand	44,732
Vietnam	28,691
Austria	5,751
Croatia	4,104
France	21,661
Germany	16,411
Greece	7,337
Ireland	8,798
Italy	32,391
Netherlands	8,195
Spain	15,558
Switzerland	4,605
United Kingdom	117,968
Argentina	4,309
Brazil	5,679
Canada	32,875
Chile	4,793
Mexico	6,034
United States	167,482
South Africa	20,278
Turkey	5,476
United Arab Emirates	7,240

== See also ==
- Visa policy of New Zealand
- New Zealand passport

== Notes ==
- This article incorporates text by SafeTravel, New Zealand Government available under the CC BY 4.0 license.
