= New Zealand Refugee Travel Document =

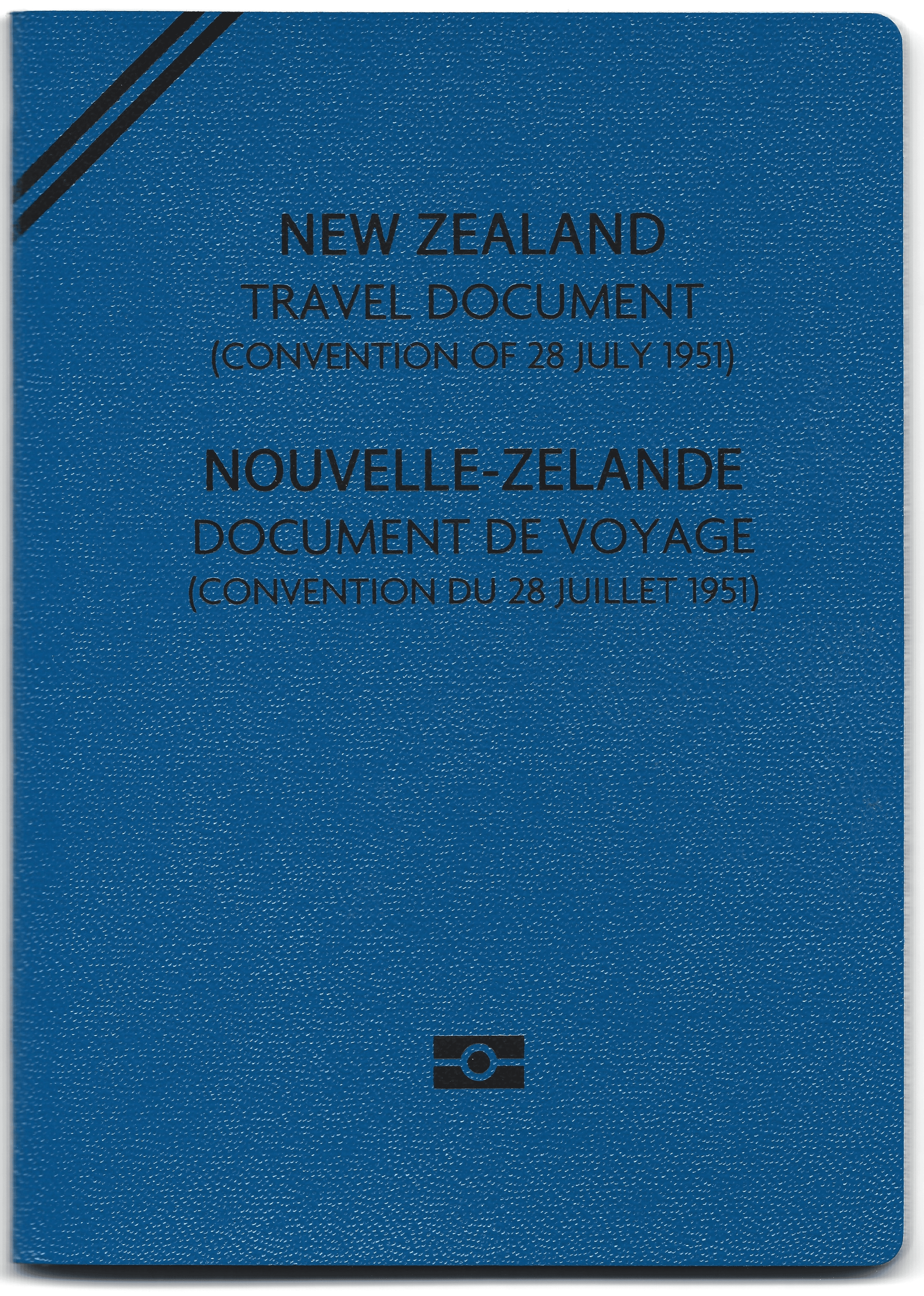
- Type: Refugee travel document
- Issued by: New Zealand
- Purpose: International travel document
- Eligibility: recognized refugee in New Zealand

The New Zealand Refugee Travel Document is a refugee travel document (RTD), an international biometric travel document, issued by the Department of Internal Affairs to a recognised refugee in New Zealand.

The cost of an application for an RTD is NZ$111.

== Use ==
Few foreign countries/territories which offer visa-free access to New Zealand passport holders confer the same privilege to holders of the New Zealand Refugee Travel Document.

However, RTD holders who are legally resident in New Zealand can enter Germany, Hungary, Slovakia and Slovenia visa-free for a maximum of 90 days in a 180-day period. In the case of Germany, for recognised refugees to enter visa-free, their RTD must be endorsed and issued under the terms of the Agreement of 15 October 1946 regarding the issue of travel documents to refugees or the 1951 Convention relating to the Status of Refugees, as well as an authorisation to return to New Zealand which has a sufficiently long period of validity.

== See also ==
- New Zealand Certificate of Identity
