= New Zealand Certificate of Identity =

Travel document

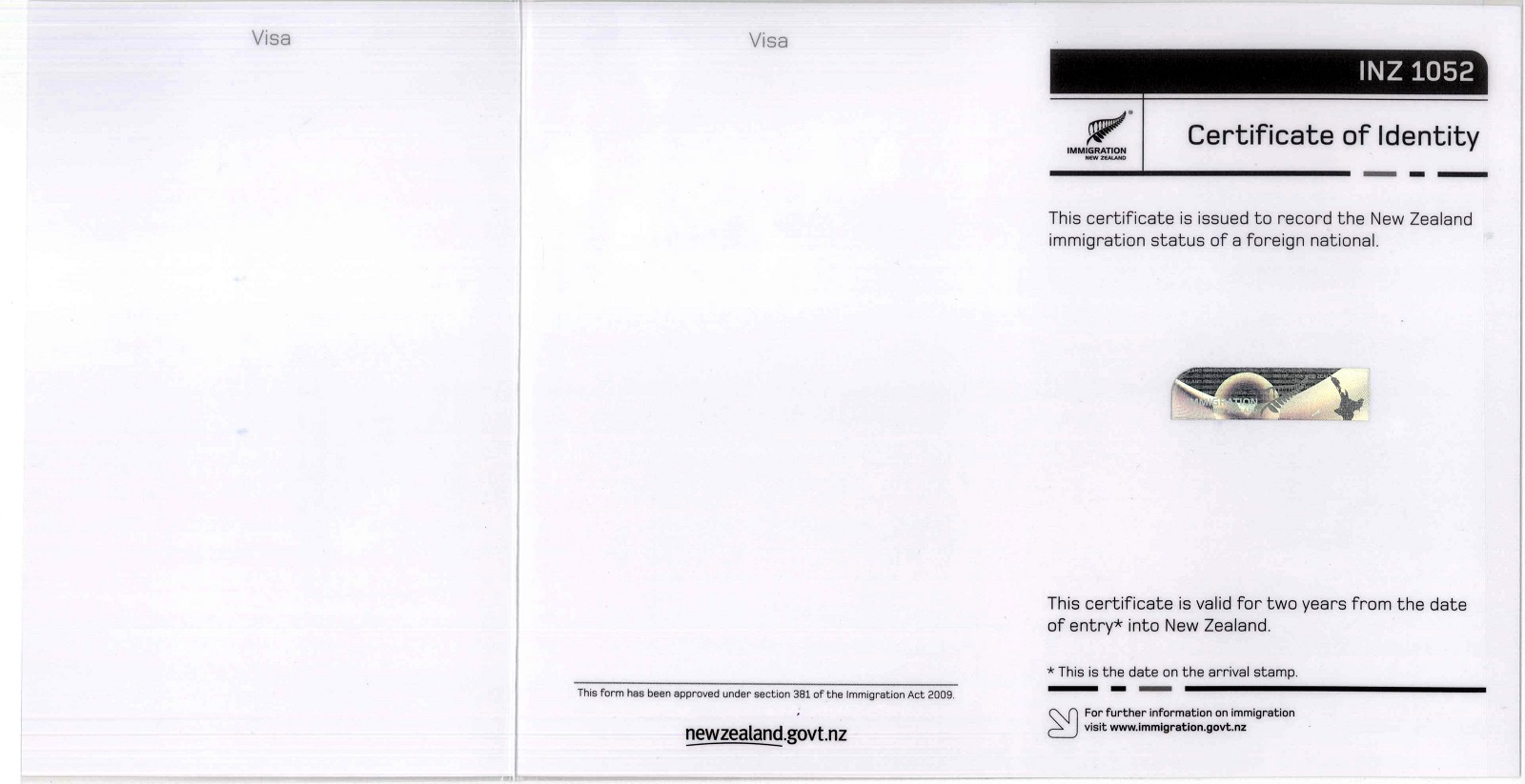
- Type: Travel document
- Issued by: New Zealand
- Purpose: International travel document
- Eligibility: alien resident of New Zealand
- Expiration: 2 year

The New Zealand Certificate of Identity is an international biometric travel document issued by the Department of Internal Affairs to an alien resident of or visitor to New Zealand who is unable to obtain a national passport, or has a national passport unacceptable to Immigration New Zealand so that they can leave New Zealand. It is not usually issued to a person whose government is represented in either New Zealand or Australia.

The New Zealand Certificate of Identity travel document contains visa pages numbered from 4 to 24.

It has a validity of two years from the date of issue.

It states it is the property of the New Zealand Government. It states "This travel document is valid for all countries. It is the responsibility of the holder to obtain the necessary visas for travel and to comply with the immigration regulations and laws of other countries."

While New Zealand has no formal policy on stateless persons as of 2013, this document has been issued to a stateless person.

== See also ==
- New Zealand Refugee Travel Document
