= Commonwealth of Dominica passport =

Travel document

Dominican passport
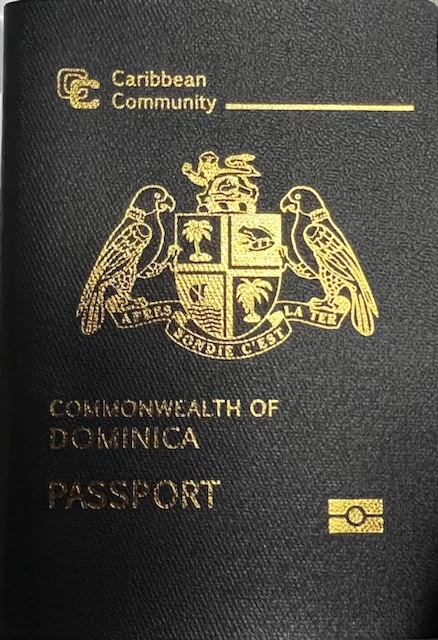
- Front cover of a biometric Dominican passport.
- Type: Passport
- Issued by: Dominica
- First issued: 12 December 2005 (R series passports); 19 July 2021 (biometric passport)
- Purpose: Identification
- Eligibility: Dominican citizenship
- Expiration: 10 years

Commonwealth of Dominica (Dominican) passports are issued to citizens of Dominica for international travel. The passport is a CARICOM passport as Dominica is a member of the Caribbean Community. The Dominican government began issuing biometric passports to its citizens on 19 July 2021, having spent $13 million upgrading its passport system to improve national security across its borders.

== Physical appearance ==
The Dominican passport shares the common design standards of CARICOM passports. The cover is black for civilians with the country's coat of arms and official name, as well as the CARICOM logo, on the front cover.

== Visa requirements ==
As of 30 March 2026, Dominican passport holders enjoy visa-free or visa on arrival access (including eTAs) to 145 countries and territories, ranking the Dominican passport 26th in the world in terms of travel freedom according to the Henley Passport Index. Passport holders may travel to the Schengen Area with relative ease and without challenging visa requirements.

== See also ==
- Visa requirements for Dominica citizens
- Dominican passport information on PRADO
- Henley Passport Index
- Caribbean passport
