= Surinamese passport =

Passport issued to citizens of Suriname

- The front cover of a contemporary Surinamese machine-readable passport.
- Type: Passport
- Issued by: Suriname
- Purpose: Identification
- Eligibility: Surinamese citizenship

The Surinamese passport (Dutch: Surinaams paspoort) is issued to citizens of Suriname for international travel. The passport is a Caricom passport as Suriname is a member of the Caribbean Community.

As of 1 January 2017, Surinamese citizens had visa-free or visa on arrival access to 74 countries and territories, ranking the Surinamese passport 65th in terms of travel freedom (tied with Botswana passport) according to the Henley visa restrictions index.

== Caribbean ==
- Visa policy toward Surinamese in the region
  - British
  - Dutch
  - French

== See also ==
- Visa requirements for Surinamese citizens
- Visa policy of Suriname
