= Saint Lucian passport =

Passport issued to citizens of Saint Lucia

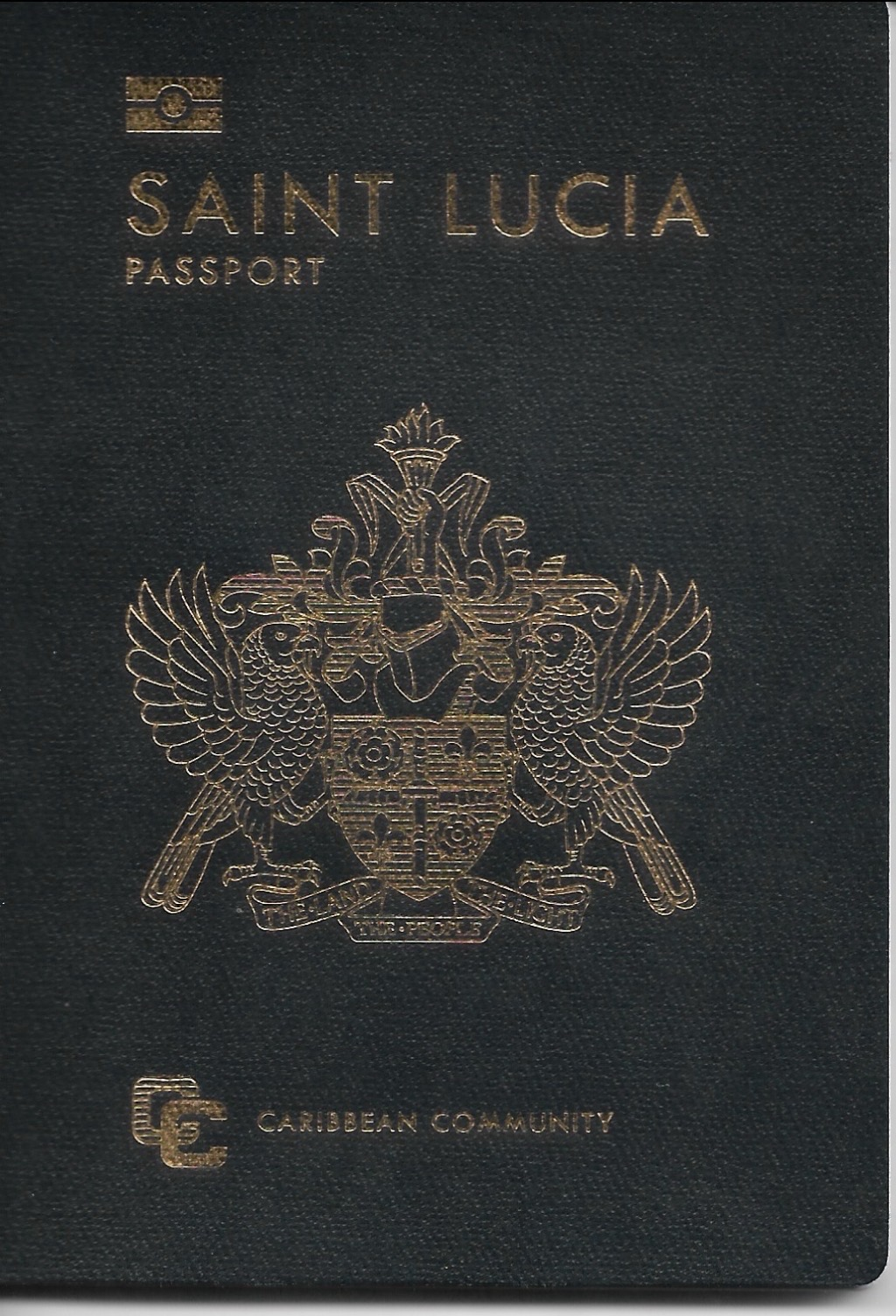
- Front cover of a Saint Lucian ePassport
- Type: Passport
- Issued by: Saint Lucia
- Purpose: Identification
- Eligibility: Saint Lucian citizenship
- Expiration: 10 years (issued on and after 5 Aug 2025)

Saint Lucian passports are issued to citizens of Saint Lucia for international travel. As of 19 July 2022, Saint Lucian citizens had visa-free or visa on arrival access (including eTAs) to 147 countries and territories, ranking the Saint Lucian passport 32nd in the world in terms of travel freedom according to the Henley Passport Index.

== See also ==
- Caribbean passport
- Visa requirements for Saint Lucian citizens
- Visa policy of Saint Lucia
