= Dominican visa policy =

Dominican visa policy may refer to:

- Visa policy of Dominica
- Visa policy of the Dominican Republic

== See also ==
- Visa requirements for Dominica citizens
- Visa requirements for Dominican Republic citizens
