= Dominican nationality law =

Dominican nationality law is regulated by the 1978 Constitution of the Commonwealth of Dominica, as amended; the Citizenship Act, and its revisions; and various British Nationality laws. These laws determine who is, or is eligible to be, a national of Dominica. Dominican nationality is typically obtained either on the principle of jus soli, i.e. by birth in Dominica; or under the rules of jus sanguinis, i.e. by birth abroad to parents with Dominican nationality. It can also be granted to persons with an affiliation to the country, or to a permanent resident who has lived in the country for a given period of time through naturalisation. There is also, currently a program in Dominica for acquiring nationality by investment. Nationality establishes one's international identity as a member of a sovereign nation. Though it is not synonymous with citizenship, for rights granted under domestic law for domestic purposes, the United Kingdom, and thus the Commonwealth, have traditionally used the words interchangeably.

== Acquiring Dominican nationality ==
Dominican nationality is acquired through birth, registration, or naturalisation.

=== By birth ===
Birthright nationality applies to:

- Persons who are born within the territory, except if the parent has diplomatic immunity or is a national of a country at war with Dominica;
- Persons who are born abroad to at least one parent who was born Dominica; or
- Persons born upon aircraft or ships registered in Dominica or unregistered aircraft or ships belonging to the government.

=== By registration ===
Nationality by registration includes those who have familial or historic relationship affiliations with Dominica. It also includes a scheme to acquire nationality through investment. Persons who acquire nationality by registration include:

==== By affiliation ====
- Persons who were the spouse or widow/er of a national who acquired nationality at the time of independence, or would have acquired nationality except for the death of the spouse;
- Minor persons who were born to a Dominican father, or a father who would have acquired such nationality had he not died prior to independence, upon three years residency and taking an Oath of Allegiance;
- Post-independence, the spouse of a national who has been married and living with a national of the territory for a minimum of three years, who can speak English and takes an Oath of Allegiance;
- Persons who are nationals of a Commonwealth nation, who have become residents of Dominica and resided in the territory or worked for the government for at least five years;
- Persons who would have become a national at independence but were ineligible solely for having had to renounce British citizenship to acquire another nationality;
- Minors under age eighteen who are legally adopted by a national or would have been eligible to be registered as an adoptee, while a minor, of a national had the parent not died; or
- Minor children born after acquisition of nationality to those parents who acquired nationality by investment.

==== By investment ====
Requirements for acquiring nationality by investment in Dominica include payment of fees, which in 2020 were US$25,000 for the main applicant, US$35,000 for an applicant with three dependents, US$50,000 for an applicant with five dependents, and US$70,000 for an applicant with more than six dependents. Separate fees are charged for siblings of the main applicant. The primary applicant must be 18 years of age or older and must make a minimum investment, which in 2020 was US$200,000 in an approved project. Agents of the Citizenship by Investment Unit are responsible for processing applications. Applicants must pay non-refundable due diligence fees for background checks and provide other documentation, such as medical reports, identity documents, and a police report, as required.

=== By naturalisation ===
Ordinary naturalisation in Dominica can be obtained by adult persons of legal capacity, who in the 12 months prior to submitting an application resided in the territory, are of good character, and intend to be a resident of Dominica. Applicants petition the Minister responsible for immigration, who considers whether the applicant has adequate knowledge of the English language and Dominican civics; and has resided within the territory, worked for the government, or has combined residency and government service for seven years. Upon approval applicants must take an Oath of Allegiance.

== Loss of nationality ==
Nationals may voluntarily renounce their affiliation with Dominica, if the declarant is a legal adult and is able to acquire other nationality, eliminating the prospect of statelessness within twelve months. Renunciation may not be accepted if Dominica is in a war with the proposed new source of nationality. Denaturalisation may occur if a person obtained nationality through fraud, false representation, or concealment; if they have committed acts of treason; if they have committed acts of disloyalty or service to a foreign government; if they are found guilty of certain criminal offences; if their spouse or parent loses their nationality; and in the case of nationality by investment for failure to meet requirements of the program.

== Dual nationality ==
Dual nationality has been acceptable since independence by virtue of the Dominica Modification of Enactments Order 1978.

== Commonwealth citizenship ==
Dominican citizens are also Commonwealth citizens by default as well.

== History ==
=== Colonial Spain and France (1493–1653) ===
In the autumn of 1493, Spaniards landed on Dominica. Despite attempts to enslave the Kalinago, or Carib, people they encountered there, the native inhabitants' resistance resulted in little attempt by Spain to establish settlements on the island. From the time Europeans encountered the island it was primarily used by them as a waystation for collecting supplies, like lumber and water. As Spanish influence waned in the mid-sixteenth century, Dutch, English and French traders began interacting with the indigenous population. In 1626, the Compagnie de Saint-Christophe was chartered by Louis XIII's chief minister, Cardinal Richelieu to colonise the Lesser Antilles. In 1627 a royal patent was issued by Charles I of England to James Hay, 1st Earl of Carlisle granting rights over Dominica and other islands situated between 10° and 20° north latitude, creating a competing claim. From the 1690s, French settlements were created in Dominica to harvest lumber. Slavery in the French colonies was regulated by the Code Noir. In 1742 the Governor of Martinique sent a commander to Dominica to establish a formal system of government. A prison was built, a militia was organized, and a civil infrastructure which included a judge and a notary, as well as officials, was established. The rival claims were finally settled between 1759 and 1761 in a series of conflicts, when Britain acquired the island from France during the Seven Years' War. British sovereignty was established with the signing of the Treaty of Paris in 1763.

=== British colony (1653–1978) ===
In Britain, allegiance, in which subjects pledged to support a monarch, was the precursor to the modern concept of nationality. The crown recognised from 1350 that all persons born within the territories of the British Empire were subjects. Those born outside the realm — except children of those serving in an official post abroad, children of the monarch, and children born on a British sailing vessel — were considered by common law to be foreigners. Marriage did not affect the status of a subject of the realm. In the first decade that the colony was under British rule, it was converted from small farms cultivating coffee, cocoa, and spices to a sugar economy, based on the plantation model. Unlike other colonial powers with slave societies in the Caribbean, the British did not have a single overarching slave code: each British colony was allowed to establish its own rules about the slave trade, and a new code was established for Dominica in 1768. Because of the small, minority white population, Britain made attempts to attract white settlers and their wives, building schools and churches, hoping to stave off the absenteeism which plagued earlier established colonies. The social hierarchy was rigid. For example, all of the members of the Colonial Council for the Southern Caribbee Islands, established in 1764, were the most prominent British subjects of the colonies of Dominica, Grenada, St. Vincent, and Tobago. Francophone Catholic men who took an Oath of Allegiance and Supremacy were allowed to participate in elections, but could not stand for office. Free men of colour were barred from certain land purchases and were not allowed to vote. Married women were subjugated to the authority of their husbands under coverture, and the law was structured to maintain social hierarchies by regulating familial matters like who could marry, legitimacy, and inheritance. Children in slave societies followed the status of the mother, thus if she was free her children would be free or if she was in bondage, her children would also be bound.

Other than common law, there was no standard statutory law which applied for subjects throughout the realm, meaning different jurisdictions created their own legislation for local conditions, which often conflicted with the laws in other jurisdictions in the empire. (Note: For example, Catholics throughout the British empire were not allowed to vote, hold seats in the Assembly, or be appointed as judges, but from 1764, French Catholics, who had recently been enemies of war, were afforded rights by the Colonial Council for the Southern Caribbee Islands. A 1767 law passed by the same Colonial Council required freedmen of colour to record their manumissions with the Registrar's office or obtain sworn affidavits from two credible free men in the islands who had known the person for five years and could vouch for their status. Elsewhere in the British colonies, such oaths were unprecedented.) Nationality laws passed by the British Parliament were extended only to the Kingdom of Great Britain, and later the United Kingdom of Great Britain and Ireland. In 1807, the British Parliament passed the Slave Trade Act, barring the Atlantic slave trade in the empire. The Act did not abolish slavery, which did not end until the 1833 Emancipation Act went into effect in 1834. Under its terms, slaves were converted into apprentices and remained bound to their former owners for four years if they had worked in the home and for six years if they had been field labourers. Because of administrative problems and a lack of evidence that the apprentice program was preparing former slaves for freedom, Britain ended all apprenticeships effective on 1 August 1838. Though free, there was never a British plan to give former slaves a voice in Parliament, leaving them as British subjects in a highly stratified system of rights. Denied political and economic rights, former slaves were not entitled to formal recognition as nationals by other nations.

In 1833, Dominica was included in partially-federal arrangement of the British Leeward Islands under the authority of the Governor of Antigua. After a failed attempt for Dominica to become a crown colony in 1865, it was reorganized with the Leeward Islands into the Federal Colony of the Leeward Islands in 1871. A successful bill in 1898 to become a crown colony transferred responsibility for island affairs to Britain. In 1911, at the Imperial Conference a decision was made to draft a common nationality code for use across the empire. The British Nationality and Status of Aliens Act 1914 allowed local jurisdictions in the self-governing Dominions to continue regulating nationality in their territories, but also established an imperial nationality scheme throughout the realm. The uniform law, which went into effect on 1 January 1915, required a married woman to derive her nationality from her spouse, meaning if he was British, she was also, and if he was foreign, so was she. It stipulated that upon loss of nationality of a husband, a wife could declare that she wished to remain British and provided that if a marriage had terminated, through death or divorce, a British-born national who had lost her status through marriage could reacquire British nationality through naturalisation without meeting a residency requirement. The statute reiterated common law provisions for natural-born persons born within the realm on or after the effective date. By using the word person, the statute nullified legitimacy requirements for jus soli nationals. For those born abroad on or after the effective date, legitimacy was still required, and could only be derived by a child from a British father (one generation), who was natural-born or naturalised. Naturalisations required five years residence or service to the crown.

Amendments to the British Nationality Act were enacted in 1918, 1922, 1933 and 1943 changing derivative nationality by descent and modifying slightly provisions for women to lose their nationality upon marriage. Because of a rise in statelessness, a woman who did not automatically acquire her husband's nationality upon marriage or upon his naturalisation in another country, did not lose their British status after 1933. In 1940, Dominica was transferred from the Colony of the Leeward Islands to the Colony of the British Windward Islands. The 1943 revision of the Act allowed a child born abroad at any time to be a British national by descent if the Secretary of State agreed to register the birth. Under the terms of the British Nationality Act 1948 British nationals in Dominica were reclassified at that time as "Citizens of the UK and Colonies" (CUKC). The basic British nationality scheme did not change overmuch, and typically those who were previously defined as British remained the same. Changes included that wives and children no longer automatically acquired the status of the husband or father, children who acquired nationality by descent no longer were required to make a retention declaration, and registrations for children born abroad were extended.

In 1958, Dominica joined the West Indies Federation. The federation, which included Barbados, British Leeward Islands, the British Windward Islands, Jamaica, and Trinidad and Tobago, was typically seen by its supporters as a means to use a federal structure to gain national independence and eventual recognition as a Dominion. The federation was unable to develop a unified nationality scheme, as member states tended to identify with their specific island, rather than by region. The federation collapsed in 1962, but in 1967, Dominica became an Associated State, under the West Indies Act of that year. The terms of the Act provided that Associated States – Antigua, Dominica, Grenada, Saint Christopher-Nevis-Anguilla, Saint Lucia and Saint Vincent – were on a trajectory to become fully independent and could terminate their association upon becoming an independent Commonwealth country.

=== Post-independence (1978–present) ===
On 3 November 1978, Dominica withdrew from the Associated States and became fully independent as a republic within the Commonwealth of Nations, changing its name to the Commonwealth of Dominica. Generally, persons who had previously been nationals of Britain as defined under the classification of "Citizens of the UK and Colonies", would become nationals of Dominica on Independence Day and cease to be British nationals. Exceptions were made for persons to retain their British nationality and status if they (or their father or grandfather) were born, naturalised, or registered in a part of the realm which remained on 1 November part of the United Kingdom or colonies, or had been annexed by such a place. Other exceptions included that married women did not cease to be CUKCs unless their husband did not retain that status on Independence Day. The Dominican House of Assembly subsequently passed the Dominica Citizenship Act of 1978, supplemented the constitutional provisions for nationality. An amendment in 1983 added adoption as a means of acquisition and minor revisions to the Citizenship Act were made in 1990, 1991, and 1995.
