= Visa requirements for Dominica citizens =

Entry requirements for citizens of Dominica

Visa requirements for Dominican citizens are administrative entry restrictions imposed by the authorities of foreign states on citizens of Dominica. As 2026, Dominica citizens had visa-free or visa on arrival access (including eTAs) to 145 countries and territories, ranking the Dominican passport 26th in the world in terms of travel freedom, according to the Henley Passport Index. and It is ranked 30th by the Global Passport Power Rank.

== Visa requirement map ==
Visa Requirements for Dominica Citizen Dominica Freedom of movement Visa-free Visa available both on arrival or online Visa on arrival eVisa Visa required

== Visa requirements ==
Visa requirements for holders of normal passports traveling for tourist purposes:

| Country | Visa requirement | Allowed stay | Notes (excluding departure fees) |
|---|---|---|---|
| Afghanistan | eVisa | | Visa isn't required if born in Afghanistan or their parent is a national of Afghanistan or was born in Afghanistan.; e-Visa : Visitors must arrive at Kabul International (KBL). |
| Albania | eVisa | | Visa not required for holders of a multiple entry visa issued by the US, if having used the visa to enter the US at least once, for a maximum stay of 90 days. The maximum stay allowed under visa exemptions is granted within 6 months. |
| Algeria | Visa required | | Tourists to cities in the south of Algeria (Timimoun, Ghardaia, Ilizi, Djanet or Tamanraset) can obtain a visa upon arrival for a maximum of 30 days, but must have a return/onward ticket and a hotel reservation confirmation |
| Andorra | Visa not required | | |
| Angola | eVisa | | |
| Antigua and Barbuda | Visa not required | Freedom of movement for OECS states; ID card valid | |
| Argentina | Visa not required | 90 days | |
| Armenia | eVisa / Visa on arrival | 120 days | Obtainable on arrival at Zvartnots International Airport or prior to travel online.; May obtain a visa on arrival for a maximum stay of 120 days at a cost of 15,000 AMD. May also obtain an e-Visa in advance |
| Australia and territories | Visa required | | May apply online (Online Visitor e600 visa). |
| Austria | Visa not required | 90 days | 90 days within any 180 day period in the Schengen Area |
| Azerbaijan | Visa required | | Holding a residence visa issued by the United Arab Emirates may obtain a 30-day tourist visa on arrival in Azerbaijan. They must present their valid visa or residence permit along with their passport |
| Bahamas | Visa not required | 3 months | |
| Bahrain | eVisa | | |
| Bangladesh | Visa on arrival | 30 days | Not available at all entry points. |
| Barbados | Visa not required | 180 days | Holders of Caricom Certificate of Skills can stay indefinitely. |
| Belarus | Visa not required | 30 days | Must arrive and depart via Minsk International Airport. |
| Belgium | Visa not required | 90 days | 90 days within any 180 day period in the Schengen Area |
| Belize | Visa not required | 6 months | Holders of Caricom Certificate of Skills can stay indefinitely. |
| Benin | Visa not required | 90 days | Must have an international vaccination certificate. |
| Bhutan | eVisa | | Applicants can independently obtain an e-Visa whose duration of stay is 90 days. Visa fee is 40 USD per person (nonrefundable). Visa application may be processed within 5 business days.; e-Visa applicant is also subject to pay Sustainable Development Fee of 100 USD per day. |
| Bolivia | Visa on arrival | 90 days | |
| Bosnia and Herzegovina | Visa not required | 90 days | |
| Botswana | Visa not required | 90 days | 90 days within any year period |
| Brazil | Visa not required | 90 days | 90 days within any 180 day period |
| Brunei | Visa required | | |
| Bulgaria | Visa not required | 90 days | 90 days within any 180 day period in the Schengen Area |
| Burkina Faso | eVisa | | |
| Burundi | Visa on arrival | | |
| Cambodia | e-Visa/Visa on Arrival | 30 days | Visa obtainable online. |
| Cameroon | eVisa | | |
| Canada | Visa required | | Visa not required for US permanent resident card Holders. |
| Cape Verde | Visa on arrival | | Not available at all entry points.; Requirement to register online 5 days before arrival.; Also pay the airport security fee of CVE 3400 either online or on arrival. |
| Central African Republic | Visa required | | |
| Chad | eVisa | | |
| Chile | eVisa | | Visa obtainable online |
| China | Visa not required | 30 days | Visa-free agreement signed with China in effect from 19 Sep 2022. |
| Colombia | Visa not required | 90 days | Extendable up to 180-days stay within a one-year period |
| Comoros | Visa on arrival | 45 days | |
| Republic of the Congo | Visa required | | |
| Democratic Republic of the Congo | eVisa | 7 days | |
| Costa Rica | Visa not required | 30 days | |
| Côte d'Ivoire | eVisa | 90 days | e-Visa holders must arrive via Port Bouet Airport. |
| Croatia | Visa not required | 90 days | 90 days within any 180 day period in the Schengen Area |
| Cuba | Visa not required | 28 days | |
| Cyprus | Visa not required | 90 days | 90 days within any 180 day period |
| Czech Republic | Visa not required | 90 days | 90 days within any 180 day period in the Schengen Area |
| Denmark | Visa not required | 90 days | 90 days within any 180 day period in the Schengen Area |
| Djibouti | eVisa / visa on arrival | 31 days | |
| Dominican Republic | Visa not required | 90 days | |
| Ecuador | Visa not required | 90 days | |
| Egypt | Visa on arrival | 30 days | On-arrival visa costs 25 USD for Single entry visa (Tourism). |
| El Salvador | Visa required | | Visa not required for Holders of a valid visa issued by Canada, the USA or a Schengen Member State. |
| Equatorial Guinea | eVisa | | Must arrive via Malabo International Airport, processing fee 75 USD |
| Eritrea | Visa required | | |
| Estonia | Visa not required | 90 days | 90 days within any 180 day period in the Schengen Area |
| Eswatini | Visa not required | 30 days | |
| Ethiopia | eVisa | up to 90 days | eVisa holders must arrive via Addis Ababa Bole International Airport |
| Fiji | Visa not required | 4 months | |
| Finland | Visa not required | 90 days | 90 days within any 180 day period in the Schengen Area |
| France | Visa not required | 90 days | 90 days within any 180 day period in the Schengen Area |
| Gabon | eVisa | | Electronic visa holders must arrive via Libreville International Airport. |
| Gambia | Visa not required | 90 days | |
| Georgia | Visa not required | 90 days | 90 days per 180 days period |
| Germany | Visa not required | 90 days | 90 days within any 180 day period in the Schengen Area |
| Ghana | Visa not required | 60 days | May transit without a visa or enter without a visa for up to 60 days per entry for business, tourism or family visits |
| Greece | Visa not required | 90 days | 90 days within any 180 day period in the Schengen Area |
| Grenada | Visa not required | Freedom of movement for OECS states; ID card valid | |
| Guatemala | Visa required | | Visa not required for a max. stay of 90 days for holders of a valid visa issued by Canada, the USA or a Schengen Member. |
| Guinea | eVisa | 90 days | |
| Guinea-Bissau | Visa on arrival | 90 days | |
| Guyana | Visa not required | 6 months | Holders of Caricom Certificate of Skills can stay indefinitely. |
| Haiti | Visa not required | 3 months | |
| Honduras | Visa required | | Visa not required for holders of a visa valid for at least 6 months on arrival, issued by Canada, the USA or a Schengen Member State . |
| Hungary | Visa not required | 90 days | 90 days within any 180 day period in the Schengen Area |
| Iceland | Visa not required | 90 days | 90 days within any 180 day period in the Schengen Area |
| India | eVisa | 60 days | e-Visa holders must arrive via 32 designated airports (Note: Ahmedabad; Amritsar; Bagdogra; Bengaluru; Bhubaneswar; Chandigarh; Chennai; Coimbatore; Delhi; Gaya; Goa-Dabolim; Goa-Manohar; Guwahati; Hyderabad; Indore; Jaipur; Kannur; Kochi; Kolkata; Kozhikode; Lucknow; Madurai; Mangaluru; Mumbai; Nagpur; Port Blair; Pune; Surat; Thiruvananthapuram; Tiruchirappalli; Varanasi; Visakhapatnam) or 5 designated seaports. (Note: Chennai; Cochin; Mormugao (Goa); Mumbai; Mangalore); An Indian e-Tourist Visa may only be obtained twice within 1 calendar year.; Foreigners of Pakistani origin or who hold a Pakistani Passport are not eligible for an e-Visa. Foreigners who are not Pakistani nationals, but whose parents or grandparents (either paternal or maternal) were born in, or were permanent residents in Pakistan, are also not eligible for an e-Visa. |
| Indonesia | Visa required | | |
| Iran | eVisa/Visa on arrival | 30 days | Arriving at Kish (KIH) or Qeshm (GSM) do not need a visa for a maximum of 14 days.; Can obtain a visa on arrival at Mashhad International Airport (MHD), Tehran International Airport (IKA), Tabriz International Airport (TBZ), Esfahan International Airport (IFN) and Bandar Abbas International Airport (BND) for a maximum of 30 days |
| Iraq | eVisa | | |
| Ireland | Visa required | | |
| Israel | Electronic Travel Authorization | 3 months | Non-Ordinary passports require a visa |
| Italy | Visa not required | 90 days | 90 days within any 180 day period in the Schengen Area |
| Jamaica | Visa not required | 6 months | Holders of Caricom Certificate of Skills can stay indefinitely. |
| Japan | Visa required | | Holders of a residence permit in Australia, Brazil, Cambodia, Canada, India, Saudi Arabia, Singapore, South Africa, Taiwan, United Arab Emirates, United Kingdom, United States. can apply for a single entry e-visa individually. The duration of stay for these jurisdictions is up to 90 days (unless otherwise noted). e-Visa holder must arrive in Japan by air. |
| Jordan | eVisa/Visa on arrival | 30 days | Conditions apply.; Not available at all entry points. |
| Kazakhstan | eVisa | | |
| Kenya | Visa not required | 90 days | |
| Kiribati | Visa not required | 90 days | |
| North Korea | Visa required | | |
| South Korea | Electronic Travel Authorisation | 90 days | Korean electronic travel authorization for 2 years. |
| Kuwait | Visa required | | e-Visa can be obtained for holders of a Residence Permit issued by a GCC member state |
| Kyrgyzstan | eVisa | | Electronic visa holders must arrive via Manas International Airport or Osh Airport or through land crossings with China (at Irkeshtam and Torugart), Kazakhstan (at Ak-jol, Ak-Tilek, Chaldybar, Chon-Kapka), Tajikistan (at Bor-Dobo, Kulundu, Kyzyl-Bel) and Uzbekistan (at Dostuk). |
| Laos | eVisa / Visa on arrival | 30 days | 18 (Note: Savannakhet Airport; Lanetoui - Mengkang (China); Meuangmom - Wan Pong (Myanmar); Banvang - Ban Khok Phai (Thailand); Namngeun - Huay Kon (Thailand); Paksan - Bueng Kan (Thailand); Paktaphan - Pak Saeng (Thailand); Pangmon - Ban Huak (Thailand); Phoudou (Thailand); Dak ta ock - Nam Giang (Vietnam); La Lai (Vietnam); Namkan (Vietnam); Namphao - Cau Treo (Vietnam); Namsoy - Na Meo (Vietnam); Naphao - Cha Lo (Vietnam); Pahang - Long Sap (Vietnam); Panghok - Tây Trang (Vietnam); Phoukeua - Bo Y (Vietnam)) of the 33 border crossings are only open to regular visa holders.; e-Visa may be used to enter Laos through the Luang Prabang, Pakse and Vientiane international airports, 3 Thai-Lao Friendship Bridges (Note: Vientiane (Friendship Bridge 1); Savannakhet (Friendship Bridge 2); Bokeo (Friendship Bridge 4)), in Boten (road and railroad), and in Vientiane (at Khamsavath railway station).; Visa on arrival is available at the Luang Prabang, Pakse and Vientiane international airports, 4 Thai-Lao Friendship Bridges (Note: Vientiane (Friendship Bridge 1); Savannakhet (Friendship Bridge 2); Khammouane (Friendship Bridge 3); Bokeo (Friendship Bridge 4)) and 7 border crossings. (Note: Nongnokkheane - Trapeang Kriel (Cambodia); Boten - Bo han (China); Golden Triangle/Samliemkham (Thailand); Khamsavath railway station (Thailand); Namheuang - Ban Na Kraseng (Thailand); Vang tao - Chongmek (Thailand); Dansavan - Lao Bảo (Vietnam)) |
| Latvia | Visa not required | 90 days | 90 days within any 180 day period in the Schengen Area |
| Lebanon | Visa required | | Holding a residence permit issued by a GCC Member State on which the profession of businessmen, managers, company owners, doctors, engineers and lawyers is stated, can obtain a visa upon arrival at Beirut (BEY) Beirut International Airport. |
| Lesotho | Visa not required | 90 days | |
| Liberia | eVisa | | |
| Libya | eVisa | | |
| Liechtenstein | Visa not required | 90 days | 90 days within any 180 day period in the Schengen Area |
| Lithuania | Visa not required | 90 days | 90 days within any 180 day period in the Schengen Area |
| Luxembourg | Visa not required | 90 days | 90 days within any 180 day period in the Schengen Area |
| Madagascar | eVisa / Visa on arrival | 90 days | |
| Malawi | Visa not required | 90 days | |
| Malaysia | Visa not required | 30 days | |
| Maldives | Visa on arrival | 30 days | |
| Mali | Visa required | | |
| Malta | Visa not required | 90 days | 90 days within any 180 day period in the Schengen Area |
| Marshall Islands | Visa required | | |
| Mauritania | eVisa | | |
| Mauritius | Visa not required | 180 days | 180 days per calendar for tourism, 120 days per calendar for business |
| Mexico | Visa required | | Visa not required for holders of a visa issued by Canada, Japan, United States, United Kingdom or a Schengen Member State for a maximum stay of 180 days. |
| Micronesia | Visa not required | 30 days | |
| Moldova | Visa not required | 90 days | 90 days within any 180 day period |
| Monaco | Visa not required | | |
| Mongolia | eVisa | | |
| Montenegro | Visa not required | 90 days | |
| Morocco | Visa required | | May apply for an e-Visa if holding a valid visa or a residency document issued by one of the following countries: Schengen Area, Australia, Canada, Ireland, New Zealand, United Kingdom, United States a residency document issued by Cyprus, Japan, United Arab Emirates. |
| Mozambique | eVisa/Visa on arrival | 30 days | Conditions apply |
| Myanmar | Visa required | | |
| Namibia | eVisa | | |
| Nauru | Visa required | | Visa Issuance: Passengers with an entry permit letter (visa letter) issued by Nauru. Applications can be submitted via email before departure |
| Nepal | Visa on arrival /eVisa | 90 days | |
| Netherlands | Visa not required | 90 days | 90 days within any 180 day period in the Schengen Area |
| New Zealand | Visa required | | Holders of an Australian Permanent Resident Visa or Resident Return Visa may be granted a New Zealand Resident Visa on arrival permitting indefinite stay (pursuant to the Trans-Tasman Travel Arrangement), subject to meeting character requirements and obtaining an Electronic Travel Authority prior to departure. |
| Nicaragua | Visa not required | 90 days | |
| Niger | Visa required | | |
| Nigeria | eVisa | | |
| North Macedonia | Visa required | | Visa not required for holders of a visa issued by Canada or USA. The visa must be valid for at least 5 days beyond the period of intended stay in North Macedonia. Visa exempt for a maximum stay of 15 days. |
| Norway | Visa not required | 90 days | 90 days within any 180 day period in the Schengen Area |
| Oman | eVisa | | Holders of a GCC state resident permit can get a 28 days visa on arrival that costs 5 Omani Riyals. |
| Pakistan | eVisa | 90 days | Issued free of charge as of August 2024. |
| Palau | Visa on arrival | 30 days | |
| Panama | Visa not required | 90 days | |
| Papua New Guinea | Easy Visitor Permit | 30 days | |
| Paraguay | Visa required | | May apply online |
| Peru | Visa not required | 90 days | |
| Philippines | Visa not required | 30 days | |
| Poland | Visa not required | 90 days | 90 days within any 180 day period in the Schengen Area |
| Portugal | Visa not required | 90 days | 90 days within any 180 day period in the Schengen Area |
| Qatar | eVisa | 90 days | |
| Romania | Visa not required | 90 days | 90 days within any 180 day period in the Schengen Area |
| Russia | Visa not required | 90 days | 90 days within any 180 day period |
| Rwanda | Visa not required | 30 days | |
| Saint Kitts and Nevis | Visa not required | Freedom of movement for OECS states; ID card valid | |
| Saint Lucia | Visa not required | Freedom of movement for OECS states; ID card valid | |
| Saint Vincent and the Grenadines | Visa not required | Freedom of movement for OECS states; ID card valid | |
| Samoa | Entry Permit on arrival | 60 days | |
| San Marino | Visa not required | | |
| São Tomé and Príncipe | eVisa | | Visa is obtained online. |
| Saudi Arabia | Visa required | | Residents of GCC countries can apply for Saudi e-Visas online and residents of the United States, United Kingdom and European Union may apply for a visa on arrival |
| Senegal | Visa on arrival | | |
| Serbia | Visa not required | 90 days | 90 days within any 180 day period |
| Seychelles | Visitor's Permit on arrival | 3 months | Application submitted up to 30 days before travel |
| Sierra Leone | eVisa / Visa on arrival | | |
| Singapore | Visa not required | 30 days | |
| Slovakia | Visa not required | 90 days | 90 days within any 180 day period in the Schengen Area |
| Slovenia | Visa not required | 90 days | 90 days within any 180 day period in the Schengen Area |
| Solomon Islands | Free visa on arrival | 3 months | |
| Somalia | eVisa | 30 days | |
| South Africa | Visa required | | |
| South Sudan | eVisa | | Obtainable online; Printed visa authorization must be presented at the time of travel |
| Spain | Visa not required | 90 days | 90 days within any 180 day period in the Schengen Area |
| Sri Lanka | Electronic Travel Authorization/Visa on arrival | 30 days | The standard visitor visa allows a stay of 60 days within any 6-month period.; Visa fees (for Standard visitor visa): SAARC - USD 35; Non SAARC - USD 75; e-Visa categories will be charged an additional USD 18.50 service fee.; If transiting from any of the Sri Lankan airports, An e-Visa is exempted (2 day transit period). |
| Sudan | Visa required | | Can obtain a visa upon arrival if married to a national of Sudan or prove that are of Sudanese origins from the father's side. |
| Suriname | Visa not required | 6 months | Holders of Caricom Certificate of Skills can stay indefinitely. |
| Sweden | Visa not required | 90 days | 90 days within any 180 day period in the Schengen Area |
| Switzerland | Visa not required | 90 days | 90 days within any 180 day period in the Schengen Area |
| Syria | eVisa | | |
| Tajikistan | Visa not required | 90 days | |
| Tanzania | Visa not required | 90 days | |
| Thailand | eVisa | 30 days | |
| Timor-Leste | Visa on arrival | 30 days | Not available at all entry points. |
| Togo | eVisa | 15 days | |
| Tonga | Visa on arrival | 31 days | |
| Trinidad and Tobago | Visa not required | 6 months | Holders of Caricom Certificate of Skills can stay indefinitely. |
| Tunisia | Visa not required | | |
| Turkey | Visa required | | |
| Turkmenistan | Visa required | | Eligible for a visa on arrival for a maximum stay of 10 days if having a letter of invitation issued by a company registered in Turkmenistan and approved by the Foreign Ministry. |
| Tuvalu | Visa on arrival | 1 month | |
| Uganda | eVisa | | Determined at the port of entry.; May apply online. |
| Ukraine | Visa not required | 90 days | 90 days within any 180 day period |
| United Arab Emirates | eVisa | | May obtain a visa online through Smart Service |
| United Kingdom and Crown dependencies | Visa required | | |
| United States | Visa required | | |
| Uruguay | Visa not required | 90 days | |
| Uzbekistan | Visa not required | 30 days | |
| Vanuatu | Visa not required | 120 days | |
| Vatican City | Visa not required | 90 days | Open borders but de facto follows Italian visa policy. |
| Venezuela | Visa not required | 90 days | |
| Vietnam | eVisa | 90 days | Phú Quốc without a visa for up to 30 days. |
| Yemen | Visa required | | Dominican Citizens of Yemeni origin with a Yemeni identification document or proof of Yemeni origin do not need a visa. |
| Zambia | Visa not required | 90 days as tourists or 30 days for business | |
| Zimbabwe | eVisa /Visa on Arrival | 30 days | |

== Dependent, Disputed, or Restricted territories ==
Unrecognized or partially recognized countries

| Territory | Conditions of access | Notes |
|---|---|---|
| Abkhazia | Visa required | |
| Kosovo | Visa not required | 90 days |
| Northern Cyprus | Visa not required | |
| Palestine | Visa not required | Arrival by sea to Gaza Strip not allowed. |
| Sahrawi Arab Democratic Republic | | Undefined visa regime in the Western Sahara controlled territory. |
| Somaliland | Visa on arrival | 30 days for 30 US dollars, payable on arrival. |
| South Ossetia | Visa not required | Multiple entry visa to Russia and three day prior notification are required to enter South Ossetia. |
| Taiwan | eVisa | |
| Transnistria | Visa not required | Registration required after 24h. |

Dependent and autonomous territories

| Territory | Conditions of access | Notes |
China
| Hong Kong | Visa not required | 90 days |
| Macau | Visa not required | 90 days |
Denmark
| Faroe Islands | Visa not required | |
| Greenland | Visa not required | |
France
| French Guiana | Visa not required | |
| French Polynesia | Visa not required | |
| (France) French West Indies | Visa not required | Includes overseas departments of Guadeloupe and Martinique and overseas collectivities of Saint Barthélemy and Saint Martin. |
| Mayotte | Visa not required | |
| New Caledonia | Visa not required | |
| Réunion | Visa not required | |
| Saint Pierre and Miquelon | Visa not required | |
| Wallis and Futuna | Visa not required | |
Netherlands
| Aruba | Visa not required | |
| Caribbean Netherlands | Visa not required | Includes Bonaire, Sint Eustatius and Saba. |
| Curaçao | Visa not required | |
| Sint Maarten | Visa not required | |
New Zealand
| Cook Islands | Visa not required | 31 days |
| Niue | Visa not required | 30 days |
| Tokelau | Visa required | |
United Kingdom
| Akrotiri and Dhekelia | Visa not required | Stays longer than 28 days per 12-month period require a permit. |
| Anguilla | Visa not required | Holders of a valid visa issued by the United Kingdom do not require a visa. |
| Bermuda | Visa required | |
| British Indian Ocean Territory | Special permit required | Special permit required. |
| British Virgin Islands | Visa not required | 1 month |
| Cayman Islands | Visa not required | 6 months |
| Falkland Islands | Visa required | |
| Gibraltar | required | |
| Montserrat | Visa not required | 6 months |
| Pitcairn Islands | Visa not required | 14 days visa free and landing fee US$35 or tax of US$5 if not going ashore. |
| Ascension Island | eVisa | 3 months within any year period |
| Saint Helena | Visitor's Pass required | Visitor's Pass granted on arrival valid for 4/10/21/60/90 days for 12/14/16/20/25 pound sterling. |
| Tristan da Cunha | Permission required | Permission to land required for 15/30 pounds sterling (yacht/ship passenger) for Tristan da Cunha Island or 20 pounds sterling for Gough Island, Inaccessible Island or Nightingale Islands. |
| South Georgia and the South Sandwich Islands | Permit required | Pre-arrival permit from the Commissioner required (72 hours/1 month for 110/160 pounds sterling). |
| Turks and Caicos Islands | Visa not required | Holders of a valid visa issued by Canada, United Kingdom or the USA do not require a visa for a maximum stay of 90 days. |
United States
| American Samoa | Visa required | |
| Guam | Visa required | |
| Northern Mariana Islands | Visa required | |
| Puerto Rico | Visa required | |
| U.S. Virgin Islands | Visa required | |
Antarctica and adjacent islands
Special permits required for Bouvet Island, British Antarctic Territory, French Southern and Antarctic Lands, Argentine Antarctica, (Australia) Australian Antarctic Territory, (Antártica Chilena Province) Chilean Antarctic Territory, (Australia) Heard Island and McDonald Islands, (Norway) Peter I Island, (Norway) Queen Maud Land, (New Zealand) Ross Dependency.

== Concerns ==
In 2023 the European Union raised concerns about especially Dominica but also some more Caribbean countries, that they sold citizenships to people from countries like Iran, Russia and China, often with a name change, so unwanted people get free access to the European Union. The EU hinted that visa exemption could be suspended for these countries. However, in 2024, The PM added that the EU officials expressed satisfaction with the island’s initiatives of the CBI Programme and labelled the meeting as highly productive. He said officials also did their on-site evaluations of the CBI and Immigration Units. They also had a meeting with the Due diligence firms to understand what they are doing. They were satisfied with what we have done and what we are doing. So, the meeting was very constructive. I think they had a completely different perspective in many aspects with regards to the CBI Programme because they rely on what they hear and what they are told.

== See also ==
- Visa policy of Dominica
- Caribbean passport
