= Tourism in Dominica =

Tourism in Dominica consists mostly of hiking in the rain forest and visiting cruise ships.

Dominica's tourist industry is in its infancy compared to other Caribbean islands. For many years its rugged terrain, lack of white beaches, and underdeveloped infrastructure prevented large-scale tourist development. In recent years, Dominica has successfully marketed itself as the "nature island of the Caribbean," seeking to attract eco-tourists interested in landscapes and wildlife. The government realizes that intensive tourism is incompatible with preserving the island's eco-system and in 1997 signed an agreement with Green Globe, the environmental division of the World Travel and Tourism Council, to develop the island as a "model ecotourism destination." The 3-year program provided technical expertise on environmental management as well as helping to market Dominica through specialist travel companies.

At the same time, the government has encouraged a steady increase in Dominica's tourism capacity, with numerous new hotels being built and considerable investment in cruise ship facilities. The new cruise ship jetty at Prince Rupert Bay, near Portsmouth, has dramatically increased the number of ships calling annually and brought significant tourism-related opportunities to the formerly depressed community of Portsmouth. Annual tourist arrivals are estimated at 200,000, of whom about 75,000 are stay-over visitors. The great majority are cruise ship visitors who spend limited time and money on the island. Revenues from tourism reached US$49 million in 1999.

Compared to many other Caribbean islands, Dominica's tourism industry may be considered to be underdeveloped (65,000 visitors per year). It does not have any world-famous chains of hotels, outside of the InterContinental Cabrits resort near Portsmouth.

However, Dominica has a few famous tourist spots, such as the Indian River in Portsmouth, Emerald Pool, Trafalgar Falls, Scotts Head (where the Atlantic Ocean meets the Caribbean Sea), and the world's second largest boiling lake, which is inside Morne Trois Pitons National Park. The national park, itself, has been designated a World Heritage Site. A 2005 New York Times article reported that locals, who believe an earthquake to be the most likely culprit, claim the boiling lake had diminished in volume and effect (in the sense of impressing visitors) in recent years.

This island country also has many diving spots with steep drop-offs, healthy marine environment, and reefs.

In 2004, because of its natural environment, Dominica was chosen to be one of the primary filming locations for Pirates of the Caribbean: Dead Man's Chest and its follow-up, At World's End. Hampstead Beach, Indian River, Londonderry River, Soufriere, and Vieille Case, which is situated on the island's northern tip, were among the places selected for filming. The production ended on May 26, 2005. The cast and crew and their island hosts had a "Dominica Survivor Party".

Celebrity Cruises, Carnival Cruise Lines, Princess Cruise Lines and Oceania Cruise Lines have made Dominica one of their ports of call. The pier is located in the capital city of Roseau and is a simple pier. Other Caribbean islands—such as St. Thomas, Barbados, St. Lucia, and Antigua—have more extensive cruise pier facilities.

The Dominica straw markets open on Tuesdays when the cruise ship docks. These shops are operated by locals and are located on the main street directly in front of the pier, as well as directly behind the Dominica Museum. No other straw markets are located on the north side of the island.

== See also ==
- Visa policy of Dominica
- Economy of Dominica
