= CARIPASS =

Travel identification program for the Caribbean

CARIPASS is a voluntary travel card programme that will provide secure and simple border crossings for Caribbean Community (CARICOM) citizens and some legal residents of CARICOM nations. The CARIPASS initiative is coordinated by the Implementation Agency for Crime and Security (CARICOM IMPACS), and seeks to provide standardised border control facilities within participating Caribbean communities.

The CARIPASS will be accepted as a valid travel document within and between participating member states and will allow cardholders to access automated gate facilities at immigration checkpoints that will use biometric technology to verify the user.

== Background ==
The Twenty-Eighth Meeting of the Conference of the Caribbean Community of Heads of Government that took place in Antigua and Barbuda in July 2007 agreed to the introduction of a regional travel card. The card would be supported by security features and would facilitate "hassle free" movement of nationals and legal residents of CARICOM States. The Twenty-Ninth Meeting of the Conference of Heads of Government in July 2008 agreed to the development and implementation of a voluntary, trusted traveller programme which would assist in the promotion of domestic tourism and would facilitate travellers.

=== Past efforts at standardisation of border controls ===
In 2007, CARICOM hosted ICC Cricket World Cup during the period 13 March to 28 April 2007. In preparation for this surge of international visitors to the nine host countries, the Region introduced several standardised security measures to facilitate the ease of processing visitors. Dominica also agreed to implement the standardised security. Such features included the introduction of an Advance Passenger Information System, a standardised Embarkation/Disembarkation (E/D) Card and a Common CARICOM Visa.

Another significant feature was a standardised wristband that was applied to persons travelling via air or transiting to cruise ship vessels. This security band, which featured a different random colour for each day, allowed persons who had already entered one of the Participating nine countries or Dominica to be considered as domestic travelers. The wristband travelers were recognised by immigration as travelling within a virtual Single Domestic Space, and as such were not processed as international travelers. The wristband initiative was a collaborative effort between the Participating CARICOM Member States, the Joint Regional Communications Centre (JRCC) and the Implementation Agency for Crime and Security (IMPACS).

== Participating member states ==
- Antigua and Barbuda
- Barbados
- Dominica
- Grenada
- Guyana
- Jamaica
- Saint Kitts and Nevis
- Saint Lucia
- Saint Vincent and the Grenadines
- Trinidad and Tobago

== Infrastructure ==
The CARIPASS System was based on existing hardware and other infrastructure put in place for the Common CARICOM visa of 2007. Due to this decision by the Conference of Heads of CARICOM, the initial launch of CARIPASS System is initially limited to the ten Member States that participated in the Common Visa System.

== Legislation ==
In CARICOM, the introduction of any new system must be accompanied by relevant legislation. For CARIPASS, two pieces of legislation are required for the document to be recognised as a valid travel document, and to ensure the automatic gates are recognised as legitimate immigration checkpoints. These are the CARIPASS Treaty and CARIPASS national legislation.

The CARIPASS Treaty entered into force following the signature of six CARICOM Member States in March 2010. To date, seven CARICOM Member States are party to the CARIPASS Treaty, six of which are participating states in the CARIPASS System.

The model CARIPASS legislation was coordinated through the Office of the General Counsel, CARICOM. The model legislation is pending review by the Legal Affairs Committee of CARICOM, but would be completed and distributed to all CARICOM States in 2011. Each State must be party to the CARIPASS Treaty and enact any relevant national legislation prior to launching the System.

Below is a list of the participating member states with details on the CARIPASS Treaty.

Member states who have signed the treaty

- Antigua and Barbuda (12 March 2010)
- Grenada (12 March 2010)
- St. Kitts and Nevis (12 March 2010)
- Saint Lucia (11 March 2010)
- Trinidad and Tobago (12 March 2010)

Member states who have acceded to the treaty

- Guyana (27 April 2010)

Member states who have not yet signed the treaty

- Barbados
- Dominica
- Jamaica
- St. Vincent & the Grenadines

== Eligibility ==
The Conference of Heads of Government of CARICOM agreed to the eligibility categories for the introduction of the CARIPASS. Given that the CARIPASS uses biometric technology to match the cardholder against the information within the CARIPASS System, the cardholder must be a minimum of sixteen (16) years of age. One reason for the age requirement is that biometrics, such as fingerprints and iris shape can change with age.

Under the proposed free movement of the Revised Treaty of Chaguaramas (2001), the Conference of Heads of Government supported the movement of CARICOM nationals and therefore agreed to first implement the CARIPASS for CARICOM nationals of and resident within Participating States.

Although the CARIPASS will be used within a permanent virtual Single Domestic Space, CARICOM continues to hold discussions towards reintroducing a Common Visa Regime. As such, it was also agreed that the CARIPASS would be open to some non-CARICOM nationals who had legal resident status in one or more of the Participating States but would not require a visa to enter any of the Participating States.

== Use of the CARIPASS ==
CARIPASS offers access to either the automatic immigration gate or the designated CARIPASS immigration lane. Random immigration compliance checks continue to be a policy practiced by immigration officials in all states, and this system is expected to reflect this international norm. In CARICOM, all travelers are still required to complete an Embarkation / Disembarkation (E/D) card.

The automatic gate dispenses a receipt which replaces the traditional stamp in a passport, and provides the cardholder with proof of entry or exit from the State. This receipt is a legal document which also guides persons as to length of stay or any other immigration guideline that should be noted upon landing. CARICOM citizens using the CARIPASS are automatically granted a six-month stay when visiting another participating state, while eligible non-CARICOM citizens are automatically granted three months.

== Future ==
Although the CARIPASS System was projected for launch in 2009, several challenges have affected this initial timeline. Installation of the System began in November 2010. Media coverage of the progress of the project reflects several launch dates, including January 2009, July 2009, and July 2010.

While the Caribbean Community anticipates the expansion of the acceptance of this travel document to all CARICOM Member and Associate States, the proffered launch dates have passed without movement forward. Marked increases in skepticism among the Caribbean public with respect to both the relevance and direction of CARICOM and its regional integration process in general, may affect the successful launch and expansion of CARIPASS.

== See also ==
- CARICOM passport
- APEC Business Travel Card
- NEXUS
