= Visa policy of Dominica =

Policy on permits required to enter Dominica

Most visitors to Dominica may enter without a visa unless they are citizens of the Dominican Republic or Haiti.

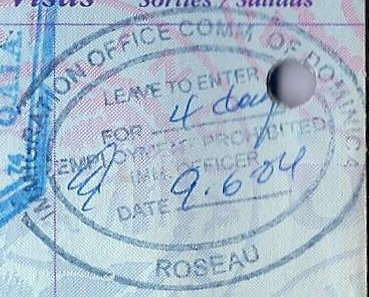
Passport stamp of Dominica issued in Roseau

== Visa policy map ==
Visa policy of Dominica Dominica Freedom of movement Visa not required (6 months) Visa not required (90 days) Visa not required (30 days) Visa not required (28 days) Visa not required (21 days) Visa required

== Visa exemption ==
Holders of passports of the following countries and territories may enter Dominica without a visa for the following period:

Freedom of movement

- Antigua and Barbuda
- Barbados
- Belize
- Grenada
- Saint Kitts and Nevis
- Saint Lucia
- Saint Vincent and the Grenadines

6 months

- All European Union member states

- Argentina
- Australia
- Bahamas
- Bangladesh
- Botswana
- Brunei
- Cameroon
- Canada
- Costa Rica
- Eswatini
- Gambia
- Ghana
- Guyana
- Hong Kong
- Iceland
- India
- Israel
- Jamaica
- Japan
- Kenya
- Kiribati
- Lesotho
- Liechtenstein
- Macau
- Malawi
- Malaysia
- Maldives
- Mauritius
- Mexico
- Mozambique
- Namibia
- Nauru
- New Zealand
- Nigeria
- Norway
- Pakistan
- Papua New Guinea
- Rwanda
- Samoa
- Seychelles
- Sierra Leone
- Singapore
- Solomon Islands
- South Africa
- South Korea
- Sri Lanka
- Suriname
- Switzerland
- Taiwan
- Tanzania
- Tonga
- Trinidad and Tobago
- Tuvalu
- Uganda
- United Kingdom
- United States
- Vanuatu
- Venezuela
- Zambia

3 months

- Brazil

90 days

- Benin
- Tajikistan
- Uruguay

90 days within any 180 days

- Russia
- Ukraine

30 days

- China

28 days

- Cuba

21 days

Holders of passports of any other country except for citizens of the Dominican Republic and Haiti.

Date of visa changes
- 21 December 1987: Israel
- 11 March 1993: citizens of any countries (21 days)
- 11 March 1993: Argentina, Belgium, Costa Rica, Denmark, France, Germany, Greece, Ireland, Israel, Italy, Japan, Luxembourg, Malta, Mexico, Netherlands (including Netherlands Antilles), Norway, Portugal, South Korea, Spain, Suriname, Sweden, Taiwan, United Kingdom, United States and Venezuela (6 months)
- 25 July 2013: Austria, Bulgaria, Cyprus, Czech Republic, Estonia, Finland, Hungary, Latvia, Lithuania, Poland, Romania, Slovakia, Slovenia (6 months)
- 20 November 2014: Brazil (3 months)
- 19 March 2015: Cuba (28 days)
- 21 May 2015: Uruguay (90 days)
- 13 August 2015: Croatia and Switzerland (6 months)
- 18 February 2016: Iceland and Liechtenstein (6 months)
- 14 January 2019: Russia (90 days)
- 13 November 2019: Ukraine (90 days)
- 17 July 2025: Tajikistan (90 days)

Cancelled:

- 1 December 2005: Dominican Republic
- 7 October 2019: Haiti

Citizens of France with an ID card may enter Dominica without a visa for a maximum stay of 2 weeks.

Citizens of Germany and United Kingdom with an ID Card may enter Dominica without a visa for a maximum stay of 1 week.

== Visitor statistics ==
Most visitors arriving to Dominica were from the following countries of nationality:

Country/Territory	2015	2014
(France) French West Indies	19,961	21,355
United States	17,773	19,595
United Kingdom	4,951	4,873
France	4,021	5,018
US Virgin Islands	3,145	3,205
Canada	2,998	3,002
Antigua and Barbuda	2,634	2,910
Dutch Caribbean and Caribbean Netherlands	2,599	1,969
Barbados	1,723	1,877
Saint Lucia	1,712	1,962
Total	74,474	81,511

== See also ==
- Tourism in Dominica
- Visa requirements for Dominica citizens
