= Visa policy of Suriname =

Policy on permits required to enter Suriname

Most visitors to Suriname may enter without a visa for up to 90 days. However, visitors from certain countries must obtain an e-Visa.

All visitors must hold a passport valid for at least 6 months.

== Visa policy map ==
Visa policy of Suriname Suriname Visa not required (6 months) Visa not required (90 days) Visa not required - Entry Fee required (90 days) Visa not required - Entry Fee required (90 days) if holding a valid Schengen or US visa; otherwise, eVisa eVisa Admission refused

== Visa exemption ==
Citizens from the following countries and territories may enter Suriname without a visa or paying an Entry Fee for the following period:

6 months

- Antigua and Barbuda
- Bahamas
- Barbados
- Belize
- Dominica
- Grenada
- Guyana
- Jamaica
- Saint Kitts and Nevis
- Saint Lucia
- Saint Vincent and the Grenadines
- Trinidad and Tobago
- Vatican City

90 days

- Montserrat

== Visa exemption - Entry Fee ==
With the exception of citizens mentioned in the next chapter, citizens of all other countries and territories may enter Suriname without a visa for visiting family / friends or for tourist purposes for up to 90 days. However, an entry fee of USD 50 or 50 euros is required to be paid online prior to arrival. The exemption from paying at the entry fee applies to the following groups of travelers below:

- All holders of passports issued by Caribbean Community (CARICOM) Member States
- Holders of diplomatic, official or service passports issued by any country
- Holders of a United Nations Laissez Passer or a Interpol Passport
- Holders of a Persons of Surinamese Origin (PSA) document or PSA card
- Holders of a passport from Vatican City
- All Citizens and Residents of Suriname

=== Substitute visa ===
Citizens of the Dominican Republic may enter Suriname without a visa for visiting family / friends or for tourist purposes for up to 90 days, and are required to pay an entry fee if holding a valid visa issued by any Schengen Area member state or the United States.

== Electronic Visa (e-Visa) ==
On 1 May 2023, Suriname unilaterally reimposed the visa requirement for citizens from 21 countries; this was said to have been due to the aforementioned citizens having abused visa-free stays in Suriname.

Citizens of the following countries must obtain an e-Visa:

- Afghanistan
- Angola
- Bangladesh
- Cameroon
- Cuba
- Dominican Republic
- Egypt
- Eritrea
- Ghana
- India
- Kenya
- Nepal
- Nigeria
- Pakistan
- Somalia
- South Africa
- Sri Lanka
- Syria
- Tunisia
- Venezuela
- Zambia

Date of visa changes
- 27 May 1974: Japan
- 13 May 2019: Russia
- 16 September 2019: Serbia
- 1 September 2020: Indonesia
- 1 May 2021: China
- 1 July 2022: All countries (except Haiti)

Cancelled:

- N/A: Belgium, Luxembourg and Netherlands (resumed on July 1, 2022)
- N/A: Sweden (resumed on July 1, 2022)
- 1 May 2023: Afghanistan, Angola, Bangladesh, Cameroon, Cuba, Dominican Republic, Egypt, Eritrea, Ghana, India, Kenya, Nepal, Nigeria, Pakistan, Somalia, South Africa, Sri Lanka, Syria, Tunisia, Venezuela and Zambia

== Haiti ==
Entry and transit is refused to Haitian citizens, even if not leaving the aircraft and proceeding by the same flight.

== Visitor statistics ==
Most visitors arriving in Suriname were from the following areas of residence or countries of nationality:

Country/Territory	2017	2016	2015	2014	2013
Netherlands	155,988	—N/a	▼82,225	▲92,104	▼88,002
Guyana	32,612	—N/a	▼42,684	▼46,288	▲50,069
French Guiana	31,675	—N/a	▼29,821	▼33,974	▲34,118
France	—N/a	—N/a	▼11,237	▲14,048	▲10,464
Brazil	16,314	—N/a	▼10,756	▼14,269	▲23,084
United States	6,827	—N/a	▼7,543	▲7,797	▼7,287
China	5,511	—N/a	▼2,319	▲3,050	▼2,356
Trinidad and Tobago	3,827	—N/a	▲5,849	▲5,081	▲5,060
Dominican Republic	2,558	—N/a	▲63	▲55	▼62
Canada	2,180	—N/a	▲2,613	▲1,826	▼1,763
Venezuela	1,981	—N/a	▼5,473	▲7,777	▲1,841
Curacao	—N/a	—N/a	▼3,597	▲3,892	▼4,219
Total	▲278,035	▲256,951	▼227,699	▲251,611	▲249,102

== See also ==
- Visa requirements for Surinamese citizens
