= Visa requirements for Surinamese citizens =

Administrative entry restrictions

Visa requirements for Surinamese citizens are administrative entry restrictions by the authorities of other states placed on citizens of the Suriname.

As of 2026, Surinamese citizens had visa-free or visa on arrival access to 75 countries and territories, ranking the Surinamese passport 60th in the world according to the Henley Passport Index.

== Visa requirements map ==
Visa requirements for Surinamese citizens holding ordinary passports Suriname Visa not required Visa on arrival eVisa Visa available both on arrival or online Visa required

== Visa requirements ==
| Country | Visa requirement | Allowed stay | Notes (excluding departure fees) |
|---|---|---|---|
| Afghanistan | eVisa | 30 days | Visa is not required in case born in Afghanistan or can proof that one of their parents is a national of Afghanistan or born in Afghanistan.; e-Visa : Visitors must arrive at Kabul International (KBL). |
| Albania | eVisa | | 90 days visa free if holds a valid, multiple-entry and previously used visa or a residence permit issued by a Schengen area country, United States, Cyprus, Ireland or the United Kingdom |
| Algeria | Visa required | | |
| Andorra | Visa required | | Andorra imposes no visa requirements, but visitor can only access Andorra via France or Spain thus multiple entries Schengen visa is required. |
| Angola | Visa not required | 30 days | Maximum 3 entries per calendar year |
| Antigua and Barbuda | Visa not required | 6 months | Holders of Caricom Certificate of Skills can stay indefinitely. |
| Argentina | Visa not required | 90 days | |
| Armenia | eVisa | 120 days | |
| Australia | Visa required | | May apply online (Online Visitor e600 visa). |
| Austria | Visa required | | |
| Azerbaijan | Visa required | | |
| Bahamas | Visa not required | 3 months | |
| Bahrain | eVisa / Visa on arrival | 14 days | |
| Bangladesh | Visa on arrival | 30 days | |
| Barbados | Visa not required | 6 months | Holders of Caricom Certificate of Skills can stay indefinitely. |
| Belarus | Visa required | | |
| Belgium | Visa required | | |
| Belize | Visa not required | | |
| Benin | eVisa | 30 days | Must have an international vaccination certificate. |
| Bhutan | eVisa | | Must pay 100 USD per person per day for Sustainable Development Fee |
| Bolivia | Online Visa / Visa on arrival | 90 days | |
| Bosnia and Herzegovina | Visa required | | 30 days visa free if hold a valid multiple entry visa holders and residents of Ireland, Cyprus, Schengen Area member states, and United States |
| Botswana | eVisa | 3 months | |
| Brazil | Visa not required | 90 days | |
| Brunei | Visa required | | |
| Bulgaria | Visa required | | |
| Burkina Faso | eVisa | 1 month | |
| Burundi | Visa on arrival | 1 month | |
| Cambodia | eVisa / Visa on arrival | 30 days | |
| Cameroon | eVisa | 30 days | |
| Canada | Visa required | | |
| Cape Verde | Visa on arrival | 30 days | |
| Central African Republic | Visa required | | |
| Chad | eVisa | 90 days | |
| Chile | Visa required | | |
| China | Visa not required | 30 days | |
| Colombia | Visa not required | 90 days | 90 days - extendable up to 180-days stay within a one-year period |
| Comoros | Visa on arrival | 45 days | |
| Republic of the Congo | Visa required | | |
| Democratic Republic of the Congo | eVisa | 7 days | |
| Costa Rica | Visa not required | 30 days | |
| Côte d'Ivoire | eVisa | 3 months | e-Visa holders must arrive via Port Bouet Airport. |
| Croatia | Visa required | | |
| Cuba | eVisa | 90 days | Can be extended up to 90 days with a fee. |
| Cyprus | Visa required | | |
| Czech Republic | Visa required | | |
| Denmark | Visa required | | |
| Djibouti | eVisa | 90 days | |
| Dominica | Visa not required | 6 months | Holders of Caricom Certificate of Skills can stay indefinitely. |
| Dominican Republic | Visa not required | 30 days | Can be extended up to 120 days |
| Ecuador | Visa not required | 90 days | |
| Egypt | Visa on arrival | 30 days | |
| El Salvador | Visa required | | 180 days visa free if hold a valid visa issued by Canada, the United States or a Schengen member state |
| Equatorial Guinea | eVisa | | Must arrive via Malabo International Airport, processing fee 75 USD |
| Eritrea | Visa required | | |
| Estonia | Visa required | | |
| Eswatini | Visa required | | |
| Ethiopia | eVisa | up to 90 days | e-Visa holders must arrive via Addis Ababa Bole International Airport |
| Fiji | Visa required | | |
| Finland | Visa required | | |
| France | Visa required | | |
| Gabon | eVisa | 90 days | e-Visa holders must arrive via Libreville International Airport. |
| Gambia | Visa required | | |
| Georgia | eVisa | 90 days | 90 days within 180 days period visa free if Hold a valid visa or residence permit issued by the European Economic Area state, Gulf Cooperation Council member state, Australia, Canada, Israel, Japan, South Korea, New Zealand, the United Kingdom or the United States |
| Germany | Visa required | | |
| Ghana | Visa required | | |
| Greece | Visa required | | |
| Grenada | Visa not required | 3 months | Holders of Caricom Certificate of Skills can stay indefinitely. |
| Guatemala | Visa required | | 90 days visa free if hold a valid visa issued by Canada, the United States or a Schengen member state |
| Guinea | eVisa | 90 days | |
| Guinea-Bissau | Visa on arrival | 90 days | |
| Guyana | Visa not required | 6 months | Holders of Caricom Certificate of Skills can stay indefinitely. |
| Haiti | Visa not required | 3 months | |
| Honduras | Visa required | | 90 days visa free if hold a valid visa issued by Canada, the United States or a Schengen member state |
| Hungary | Visa required | | |
| Iceland | Visa required | | |
| India | eVisa | 30 days | e-Visa holders must arrive via 32 designated airports (Note: Ahmedabad; Amritsar; Bagdogra; Bengaluru; Bhubaneswar; Chandigarh; Chennai; Coimbatore; Delhi; Gaya; Goa-Dabolim; Goa-Manohar; Guwahati; Hyderabad; Indore; Jaipur; Kannur; Kochi; Kolkata; Kozhikode; Lucknow; Madurai; Mangaluru; Mumbai; Nagpur; Port Blair; Pune; Surat; Thiruvananthapuram; Tiruchirappalli; Varanasi; Visakhapatnam) or 5 designated seaports. (Note: Chennai; Cochin; Mormugao (Goa); Mumbai; Mangalore); An Indian e-Tourist Visa may only be obtained twice within 1 calendar year.; Foreigners of Pakistani origin or who hold a Pakistani Passport are not eligible for an e-Visa. Foreigners who are not Pakistani nationals, but whose parents or grandparents (either paternal or maternal) were born in, or were permanent residents in Pakistan, are also not eligible for an e-Visa. |
| Indonesia | Visa not required | 30 days | |
| Iran | eVisa | 30 days | |
| Iraq | eVisa | | |
| Ireland | Visa required | | |
| Israel | ETA-IL | 90 days | |
| Italy | Visa required | | |
| Jamaica | Visa not required | 90 days | Holders of Caricom Certificate of Skills can stay indefinitely. |
| Japan | Visa not required | 90 days | |
| Jordan | Visa on arrival | 30 days | |
| Kazakhstan | eVisa | | |
| Kenya | Electronic Travel Authorisation | 90 days | Applications can be submitted up to 90 days prior to travel and must be submitted at least 3 days in advance.; eTA fee is USD 32.50.; Proof of reservation at the hotel where visitors plan to stay is required (if staying with friends, an invitation letter is also acceptable).; Yellow fever vaccination certificate is required if coming from endemic countries. |
| Kiribati | Visa not required | 90 days | 90 days within any 12-month period. |
| North Korea | Visa required | | |
| South Korea | Electronical Travel Authorization | 90 days | The validity period of a K-ETA is 3 years from the date of approval. |
| Kosovo | Visa required | | |
| Kuwait | Visa required | | |
| Kyrgyzstan | eVisa | 60 days | e-Visa holders must arrive via Manas International Airport or Osh Airport or through land crossings with China (at Irkeshtam and Torugart), Kazakhstan (at Ak-jol, Ak-Tilek, Chaldybar, Chon-Kapka), Tajikistan (at Bor-Dobo, Kulundu, Kyzyl-Bel) and Uzbekistan (at Dostuk). |
| Laos | Visa required | | if they are traveling on an official visit, they may still obtain a visa on arrival, provided they are holding an official letter of guarantee issued by the Ministry of Foreign Affairs of Laos |
| Latvia | Visa required | | |
| Lebanon | Visa required | | In addition to a visa, an approval should be obtained from the Immigration department of the General Directorate of General Security (La Surete Generale). |
| Lesotho | eVisa | 44 days | |
| Liberia | Visa required | | |
| Libya | eVisa | 30 days | |
| Liechtenstein | Visa required | | |
| Lithuania | Visa required | | |
| Luxembourg | Visa required | | |
| Madagascar | eVisa / Visa on arrival | 60 days | |
| Malawi | eVisa / Visa on arrival | 90 days | |
| Malaysia | Visa not required | 30 days | |
| Maldives | Free Visa on arrival | 30 days | |
| Mali | Visa required | | |
| Malta | Visa required | | |
| Marshall Islands | Visa required | | |
| Mauritania | eVisa | | Available at Nouakchott–Oumtounsy International Airport. |
| Mauritius | Visa not required | 180 days | 180 days per calendar year for tourism, 120 days per calendar year for business |
| Mexico | Visa required | | 180 days visa free if hold a valid visa or pernement residency of the Schengen Area, Canada, Japan, the United States or the United Kingdom, and only pernanment residency of Pacific Aliance member |
| Micronesia | Visa not required | 30 days | |
| Moldova | eVisa | | 90 days visa free if hold a valid residence permit, a valid 'C'-type, or a valid 'D'-type visa issued by a Schengen member state or a European Union member state |
| Monaco | Visa required | | Monaco imposes no visa requirements, but visitor can only access Monaco via France or Mediterranean sea thus multiple entries Schengen visa is required. |
| Mongolia | eVisa | 30 days | |
| Montenegro | Visa required | | 30 days visa free if Holda valid visa issued by the Schengen area, Australia, Japan, Canada, New Zealand, Ireland, the United States and the United Kingdom |
| Morocco | Visa required | | |
| Mozambique | eVisa / Visa on arrival | 30 days | |
| Myanmar | Visa required | | |
| Namibia | eVisa | | |
| Nauru | Visa required | | |
| Nepal | Online Visa / Visa on arrival | 90 days | |
| Netherlands | Visa required | | |
| New Zealand | Visa required | | Holders of an Australian Permanent Resident Visa or Resident Return Visa may be granted a New Zealand Resident Visa on arrival permitting indefinite stay (pursuant to the Trans-Tasman Travel Arrangement), subject to meeting character requirements and obtaining an Electronic Travel Authority prior to departure. |
| Nicaragua | Visa required | 90 days | |
| Niger | Visa required | | |
| Nigeria | eVisa | 90 days | |
| North Macedonia | Visa required | | 15 days visa free if hold a valid Type "C" multiple-entry visa for the Schengen Area or a temporary/permanent residence permit of an EU Member State or a country signatory of the Schengen Agreement |
| Norway | Visa required | | |
| Oman | Visa not required | 14 days | 30 days eVisa also available. |
| Pakistan | eVisa | 90 days | Free of charge |
| Palau | Free Visa on arrival | 30 days | |
| Panama | Visa required | | |
| Papua New Guinea | eVisa | 60 days | Visitors may apply for a visa online under the "Tourist - Own Itinerary" category. |
| Paraguay | Visa required | | |
| Peru | Visa not required | 90 days | |
| Philippines | Visa not required | 30 days | |
| Poland | Visa required | | |
| Portugal | Visa required | | |
| Qatar | Visa not required | 30 days | |
| Romania | Visa required | | |
| Russia | Visa not required | 90 days | 90 days within 180-day period. |
| Rwanda | eVisa / Visa on arrival | 30 days | |
| Saint Kitts and Nevis | Visa not required | 6 months | Holders of Caricom Certificate of Skills can stay indefinitely. |
| Saint Lucia | Visa not required | 6 months | Holders of Caricom Certificate of Skills can stay indefinitely. |
| Saint Vincent and the Grenadines | Visa not required | 6 months | Holders of Caricom Certificate of Skills can stay indefinitely. |
| Samoa | Visa not required | 60 days | |
| San Marino | Visa required | | San Marino imposes no visa requirements, but visitor can only access San Marino via Italy thus multiple entries Schengen visa is required. |
| São Tomé and Príncipe | eVisa | | |
| Saudi Arabia | Visa required | | |
| Senegal | Visa on arrival | 90 days | |
| Serbia | Visa not required | 30 days | |
| Seychelles | Electronic Border System | 3 months | Application can be submitted up to 30 days before travel.; Visitors must upload a reservation confirmation(s) for each visitor's location of stay in Seychelles.; Yellow fever vaccination certificate is required if coming from endemic countries.; Payment of the fee (EUR 10) by credit or debit card.; Valid for one journey only and it expires once exit the country. |
| Sierra Leone | eVisa | 1 month | |
| Singapore | Visa not required | 30 days | |
| Slovakia | Visa required | | |
| Slovenia | Visa required | | |
| Solomon Islands | Visa required | | |
| Somalia | eVisa | 30 days | |
| South Africa | Visa required | | |
| South Sudan | eVisa | | Obtainable online.; Printed visa authorization must be presented at the time of travel. |
| Spain | Visa required | | |
| Sri Lanka | ETA / Visa on arrival | 60 days / 30 days | The standard visitor visa allows a stay of 60 days within any 6-month period.; Visa fees (for Standard visitor visa): SAARC - USD 35; Non SAARC - USD 75; e-Visa categories will be charged an additional USD 18.50 service fee.; If transiting from any of the Sri Lankan airports, An e-Visa is exempted (2 day transit period). |
| Sudan | Visa required | | |
| Sweden | Visa required | | |
| Switzerland | Visa required | | |
| Syria | eVisa | 15 days | |
| Taiwan | Visa required | | |
| Tajikistan | eVisa | 60 days | |
| Tanzania | eVisa / Visa on arrival | 90 days | |
| Thailand | eVisa | | |
| Timor-Leste | Visa on arrival | 30 days | |
| Togo | eVisa | 15 days | |
| Tonga | Visa required | | |
| Trinidad and Tobago | Visa not required | | Holders of Caricom Certificate of Skills can stay indefinitely. |
| Tunisia | Visa required | | |
| Turkey | eVisa | 30 days | |
| Turkmenistan | Visa required | | |
| Tuvalu | Visa on arrival | 1 month | |
| Uganda | eVisa | 3 months | |
| Ukraine | eVisa | | |
| United Arab Emirates | eVisa | | May apply using 'Smart service'. |
| United Kingdom | Visa required | | |
| United States | Visa required | | |
| Uruguay | Visa required | | |
| Uzbekistan | eVisa | 30 days | 5-day visa-free transit at the international airports if holding a confirmed onward ticket for a flight to a third country. |
| Vanuatu | Visa required | | |
| Vatican City | Visa required | | Vatican City imposes no visa requirements, but visitor can only access Vatican City via Italy thus multiple entries Schengen visa is required. |
| Venezuela | eVisa | | Introduction of Electronic Visa System for Tourist and Business Travelers. |
| Vietnam | eVisa | 90 days | 30 days visa free when visit Phu Quoc Island |
| Yemen | Visa required | | Yemen introduced an e-Visa system for visitors who meet certain eligibility requirements (group travel of 10 or more people, business trips, and transit etc.). |
| Zambia | Visa not required | 90 days | |
| Zimbabwe | eVisa / Visa on arrival | 30 days | |

== Territories and disputed areas ==
Visa requirements for Surinamese citizens for visits to various territories, disputed areas and restricted zones:

| Territory | Conditions of access | Notes |
China
| Hong Kong | Visa not required | 14 days |
| Macau | Visa on arrival | 30 days |
Denmark
| Faroe Islands | Visa required | |
| Greenland | Visa required | |
France
| Clipperton Island | Special permit required | |
| French Guiana | Visa required | |
| French Polynesia | Visa required | |
| Guadeloupe | Visa required | |
| Martinique | Visa required | |
| Saint Barthélemy | Visa required | |
| Saint Martin | Visa required | |
| Mayotte | Visa required | |
| New Caledonia | Visa required | |
| Réunion | Visa required | |
| Saint Pierre and Miquelon | Visa required | |
| Wallis and Futuna | Visa required | |
Netherlands
| Aruba | Visa not required | 90 days |
| Bonaire | Visa not required | 90 days |
| Sint Eustatius | Visa not required | |
| Saba | Visa not required | |
| Curaçao | Visa not required | 90 days |
| Sint Maarten | Visa not required | 90 days |
New Zealand
| Cook Islands | Visa not required | 31 days |
| Niue | Visa not required | 30 days |
| Tokelau | Permit required | |
Norway
| (Norway) Jan Mayen | Permit required | Permit issued by the local police required for staying for less than 24 hours and permit issued by the Norwegian police for staying for more than 24 hours. |
| (Norway) Svalbard | Visa not required | Unlimited period under Svalbard Treaty. |
United Kingdom
| Akrotiri and Dhekelia | Visa required | |
| Anguilla | eVisa | Holders of a valid visa or residence permit for the United Kingdom, United States or Canada do not need a visa |
| Bermuda | Visa required | |
| British Indian Ocean Territory | Special permit required | |
| British Virgin Islands | Visa required | |
| Cayman Islands | Visa required | |
| Falkland Islands | Visa required | |
| Gibraltar | Visa required | |
| Montserrat | Visa not required | 6 months |
| Pitcairn Islands | Visa not required | 14 days visa free and landing fee US$35 or tax of US$5 if not going ashore. |
| Saint Helena | eVisa | |
| Ascension Island | eVisa | 3 months within any year period |
| Tristan da Cunha | Permission required | Permission to land required for 15/30 pounds sterling (yacht/ship passenger) for Tristan da Cunha Island or 20 pounds sterling for Gough Island, Inaccessible Island or Nightingale Islands. |
| South Georgia and the South Sandwich Islands | Permit required | Pre-arrival permit from the Commissioner required (72 hours/1 month for 110/160 pounds sterling). |
| Turks and Caicos Islands | Visa not required | 90 days |
United States
| American Samoa | Entry permit required | |
| Guam | Visa required | |
| Northern Mariana Islands | Visa required | |
| Puerto Rico | Visa required | |
| U.S. Virgin Islands | Visa required | |
Antarctica and adjacent islands
Special permits required for Bouvet Island, British Antarctic Territory, French Southern and Antarctic Lands, Argentine Antarctica, (Australia) Australian Antarctic Territory, (Antártica Chilena Province) Chilean Antarctic Territory, (Australia) Heard Island and McDonald Islands, (Norway) Peter I Island, (Norway) Queen Maud Land, (New Zealand) Ross Dependency.

== See also ==
- Visa policy of Suriname
- Surinamese passport
