= Visa policy of Saint Lucia =

Policy on permits required to enter Saint Lucia

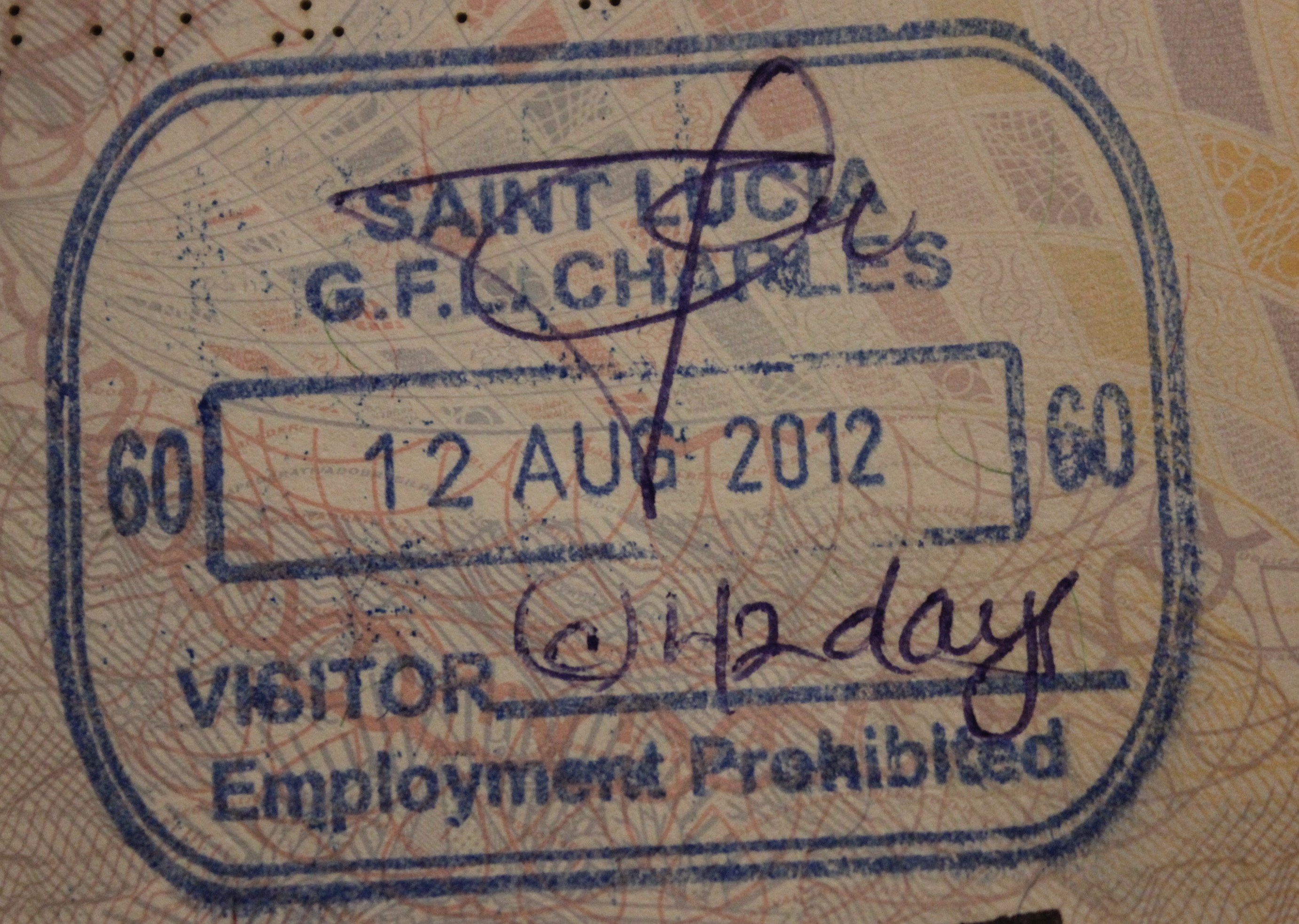
Entry stamp

Visitors to Saint Lucia must obtain a visa unless they are citizens from one of the visa-exempt countries or citizens who may obtain a visa on arrival.

== Visa policy map ==
Visa policy of Saint Lucia Saint Lucia Freedom of movement Visa not required (90 days) Visa not required (60 days) Visa not required (6 weeks) Visa not required (15 days) Visa on arrival Visa required

== Visa exemption ==
Citizens of the following countries and territories can visit Saint Lucia without a visa, for stays up to the duration listed below:

Freedom of movement

- Antigua and Barbuda
- Dominica
- Grenada
- Saint Kitts and Nevis
- Saint Vincent and the Grenadines

90 days within any 180 days

- All European Union member states (except Ireland)

- Iceland
- Liechtenstein
- Norway
- Serbia
- Switzerland

60 days

- United Arab Emirates

6 weeks

- Andorra
- Anguilla
- Argentina
- Aruba
- Australia
- Bahamas
- Barbados
- Belize
- Bermuda
- Bonaire
- Bosnia and Herzegovina
- Botswana
- Brazil
- Brunei
- Canada
- Cayman Islands
- Chile
- China
- Costa Rica
- Cuba
- Curacao
- Eswatini
- Fiji
- Georgia
- Gibraltar
- Guernsey
- Guyana
- Hong Kong
- Ireland
- Isle of Man
- Israel
- Jamaica
- Japan
- Jersey
- Kiribati
- Maldives
- Kuwait
- Lesotho
- Malawi
- Marshall Islands
- Mauritius
- Mexico
- Micronesia
- Monaco
- Montenegro
- Montserrat
- Namibia
- Nauru
- New Zealand
- Panama
- Russia
- Saba
- Samoa
- San Marino
- Seychelles
- Sint Eustatius
- Solomon Islands
- South Africa
- South Korea
- Suriname
- Taiwan
- Tanzania
- Tonga
- Trinidad and Tobago
- Turkey
- Turks and Caicos Islands
- Tuvalu
- United Kingdom
- United States
- Uruguay
- Vanuatu
- Zambia

15 days

- Singapore

Cruise ship passengers visiting Saint Lucia for one day are exempted from obtaining a visa.

Citizens of OECS countries and France can enter with a national ID card instead of a passport.

== Visa on arrival ==
Citizens of the following countries and territories may obtain a visa on arrival valid for 6 weeks:

- American Samoa
- Benin
- Bhutan
- Bolivia
- Burkina Faso
- Burundi
- Cambodia
- Cameroon
- Cape Verde
- Comoros
- Cote d'Ivoire
- Djibouti
- Ecuador
- El Salvador
- Equatorial Guinea
- Ethiopia
- Gabon
- Gambia
- Ghana
- Guatemala
- Guinea
- Guinea-Bissau
- Honduras
- India
- Kenya
- Kyrgyzstan
- Macau
- Madagascar
- Malaysia
- Mali
- Mauritania
- Mongolia
- Mozambique
- Nicaragua
- Palau
- Papua New Guinea
- Paraguay
- Peru
- Philippines
- Saint Pierre and Miquelon
- Sao Tome and Principe
- Senegal
- Sierra Leone
- Sudan
- Thailand
- Timor-Leste
- Togo
- Uganda
- Vietnam
- Wallis and Futuna
- Zimbabwe

== See also ==
- Visa requirements for Saint Lucia citizens
