= Dominica citizenship by investment programme =

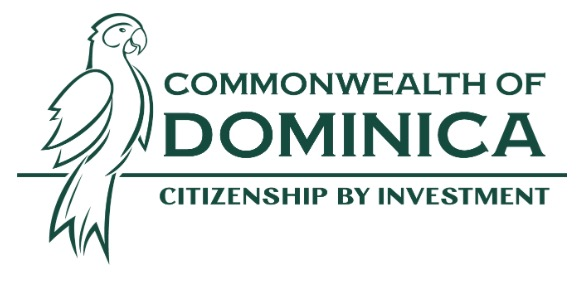
Dominica Citizenship by Investment Logo

The Commonwealth of Dominica has been operating a citizenship by investment programme since 1993, making it the second Caribbean island-nation to launch one such programme – having been preceded by the Federation of St Kitts and Nevis.

The Dominica Citizenship by Investment Programme, sometimes referred to as the Dominica Economic Citizenship Programme, is framed within Section 101 of the Constitution of the Commonwealth of Dominica, the Commonwealth of Dominica Citizenship Act 1978, and the Commonwealth of Dominica Citizenship by Investment Regulations 2014 (and amendments).

Under the Programme, an investor can acquire citizenship of Dominica upon the payment of a one-time contribution to the Economic Diversification Fund, or through the purchase of a government approved project – generally a real estate development – and the payment of associated Government fees.

The '''Citizenship by Investment Programme''' in Dominica has not only facilitated individuals in obtaining citizenship but has also significantly contributed to the nation's infrastructural revival. This contribution was particularly crucial following the two devastating natural disasters that impacted the island in recent history.

In 2015, Tropical Storm Erika wreaked havoc on the island, causing substantial damages to both property and infrastructure. The devastation was compounded in 2017 when the Category 5 Hurricane Maria ravaged the island. However, the funds accumulated through the Citizenship by Investment Programme emerged as a beacon of hope for the nation's restoration efforts.

In 2023, the government revoked the citizenship of 260 individuals for providing false information on their applications. This was a crucial measure by the government to uphold the integrity of the citizenship application process and ensure that only those meeting the necessary requirements are granted citizenship.

Leveraging the financial influx from this initiative, Dominica embarked on major infrastructural developments and restoration projects. This proactive approach underscored the resilience of the Dominican people and highlighted the significance of investment programmes in aiding nations during post-disaster recovery phases.

== Investment Options ==
Applicants can choose to directly support the nation's Economic Diversification Fund (EDF), a non-refundable contribution that funds various development projects. Alternatively, they can invest in pre-approved real estate projects, ensuring not just citizenship but also an asset. Each option comes with its own set of financial commitments.

=== Economic Diversification Fund ===
The Economic Diversification Fund (EDF) is first investment option which supports socio-economic initiatives with the aim of driving national development. All money generated for the EDF goes towards improving projects in the public and private sector which are in need of financial support. These include building schools, renovating hospitals, and the creation of a national sports stadium, as well as a variety of other undertakings across numerous industries such as tourism, information technology and agriculture.

To qualify for Dominican citizenship through the Citizenship by Investment program, applicants must make a non-refundable contribution to the EDF.

- US$100,000 for the main applicant;
- US$150,000 for the main applicant and spouse;
- US$175,000 for the main applicant and up to three dependants;
- US$25,000 for any additional applicant;

=== Real Estate ===
To qualify for Dominican citizenship under the real estate option applicant must purchase authorised property worth at least USD $200,000. Real estate must be held for either three years from the date of citizenship is granted or, if the future purchaser is also a citizenship by investment applicant, five years from the date of citizenship is granted.

If application for Dominica citizenship by real estate investment is approved, the following government fees may apply:

- US$25,000 for the main applicant;
- US$35,000 for the main applicant and up to three dependants;
- US$50,000 for the main applicant and up to five dependants;
- US$25,000 for any additional qualified dependant;

The official website of the Citizenship by Investment Unit has a list of properties where an investor can invest under the real estate option.

== Due Diligence ==
The Programme mandates that all applicants over the age of 16 undergo a comprehensive due diligence background checks, which includes a mandatory interview, usually conducted virtually. This detailed scrutiny aims to validate the authenticity of the data and information presented by applicants during their application submission.

The thoroughness of this process entails completing all official forms, undergoing a medical examination, and gathering specific supporting documents such as full page passport copy, birth certificate, education history, source of funds, 2 professional references, fingerprints and complete medical reports. Applicants must ensure that all submitted paperwork is in English and is accompanied by the necessary notarisation and legalisation to meet the set criteria.

In order to facilitate an all-encompassing evaluation, the Dominican Government charges an added fee of USD 7,500 for the main applicant, USD 4,000 for a spouse and USD 4,000 for any dependents aged 16 or above designated specifically for due diligence purposes. The due diligence fee is directly redirected to renowned third-party vetting agencies situated in the US and UK.

These agencies employ a rigorous approach to scrutinising an applicant's current status and history, both online and in-person. Key components of their evaluation method include on-site visits to the applicant's home and work properties. Additionally, these agencies collaborate with local establishments such as police, municipalities, and hospitals to confirm the validity of submitted documents.

The applicants are also required to provide financial details of the past ten years. These records are inspected to ensure that the investment funds are legitimate. The examination extends to determining whether an applicant is politically exposed and involves matching their profile with international criminal databases, including organizations like Interpol, CIA, FBI and others.

=== Mandatory Interview ===
In a progressive move, Dominica has recently set a precedent among nations offering CBI. The country has instituted a policy whereby every applicant aged 16 or over is required to participate in an interview as an integral component of the extended due diligence procedure. This step is more than just a formality; it offers an opportunity to further gauge the applicant's credibility through direct engagement.

=== Change of Name ===
In 2023, the Dominica government implemented new rules on name changes for CBI applicants. Under the new rules, CBI applicants are only allowed to change their names after they have maintained residency in Dominica for the prescribed period of time. This period of time is currently set at three years.

The Dominica Government made this change in order to address concerns about the potential for abuse of the CBI programme. Some people have used the CBI programme to obtain a new identity and escape from criminal prosecution or financial obligations. The new rules are designed to prevent this from happening.

=== Due Diligence Steps ===
The due diligence process for a CBI application is designed to assess the applicant's suitability for the programme and to mitigate any risks to the CBI country. The process typically includes the following steps:

1. Initial review of the application: The first step is to review the applicant's application form and supporting documents to ensure that they meet the eligibility requirements for the programme. This includes verifying the applicant's identity, financial status, and source of funds.
2. Background checks: The next step is to conduct a background check on the applicant. This may include checking for criminal records, financial sanctions, and any other negative information.
3. Source of funds check: The applicant will also need to provide evidence of the source of their funds. This is to ensure that the applicant's investment is not derived from illegal activities.
4. Interview: Every applicant aged 16 or over is also required to attend an interview with a due diligence officer. This interview is an opportunity for the officer to learn more about the applicant and their motivations for applying to the CBI programme.
5. Reference checks: The due diligence officer may also contact the applicant's references to verify their information and get feedback on the applicant's character.
6. Final review: Once the due diligence process is complete, the due diligence officer will prepare a report for the CBI Unit. The report will assess the applicant's suitability for the programme and make a recommendation on whether or not the applicant should be approved.

The decision-making system employed by the due diligence firms is inspired by the clarity of traffic lights. Here's how it works:

- Red Signal: This is an immediate cause for concern. If, during the vetting procedure, any document appears questionable or a discrepancy emerges, the due diligence agency flags the application with a red signal. In layman's terms, this translates to a recommendation for decline, and as a result, the CBIU is likely to reject the application.
- Yellow Signal: This denotes caution and the need for further clarity. When the due diligence firm identifies potential gaps or requires additional documentation to complete the evaluation, they mark the application with a yellow signal. It implies the applicant needs to provide supplementary information or documents to facilitate further assessment.
- Green Signal: The best outcome an applicant can hope for, a green signal is an endorsement of the individual's application. It confirms that the provided information is accurate, every person under the application has been vetted positively, and they uphold a high moral and professional repute. Consequently, the CBIU receives a green signal as a go-ahead to approve the submitted application.

== Dominica's Agreement to Implement the Six Principles ==
On 25 February 2023, Dominica along with government representatives of Antigua and Barbuda, Grenada, Saint Lucia and St Kitts and Nevis, participated in a roundtable discussion with representatives of the US Government. The “Caribbean Five” and the US reached agreement on six principles. These principles encompass:

1. Mandatory Interviews: Enforcing compulsory interviews for certain procedures.
2. Treatment of Denials: Implementing a structured approach to address application denials.
3. Additional Checks: Incorporating extra vetting steps to ensure thorough evaluations.
4. Audits: Regular inspections and checks to ensure transparency and uphold procedural integrity.
5. Retrieval of Passports: Establishing protocols for the return of passports under designated circumstances.
6. Treatment of Russians and Belarusians: Introducing specialized protocols for handling applications and processes concerning citizens of Russia and Belarus.

Dominica is the first of the five countries to have adopted and implemented these six principles.

The commitment to these principles not only fortifies Dominica’s own systems and frameworks but also paves the way as a model for other nations in their policy development and global interactions.

== National Development Through Citizenship by Investment ==
=== Climate Resilient Housing in Dominica ===
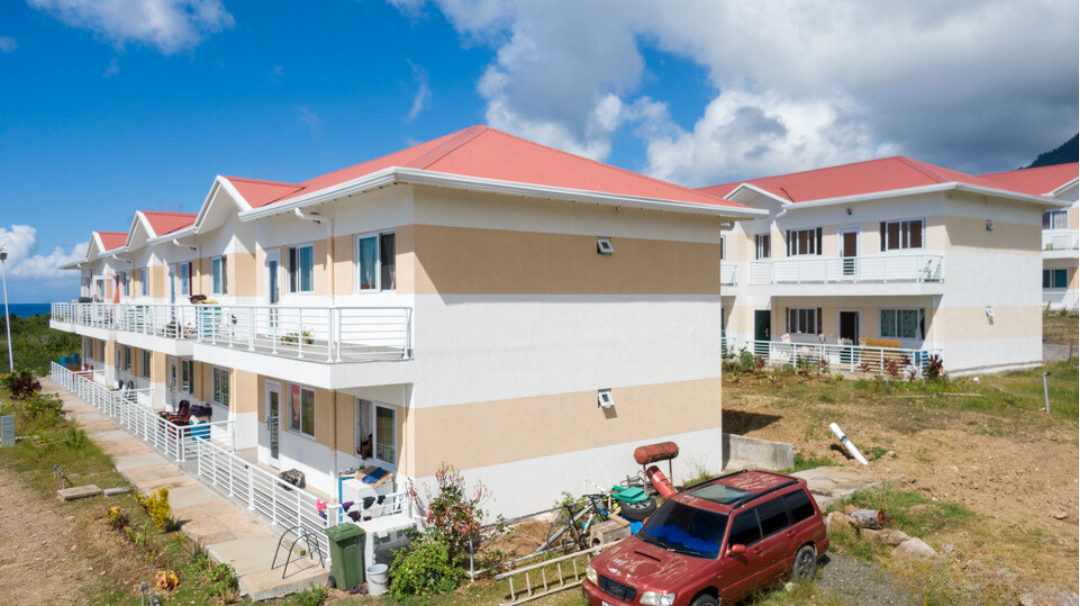
Climate Resilient Housing in Dominica

In recent years, Dominica faced the devastating impacts of significant climatic events, notably Tropical Storm Erika in 2015 and the catastrophic Category 5 Hurricane Maria in 2017. The aftermath of Hurricane Maria alone translated to a staggering loss of over 226% of the nation's GDP.

Amidst this backdrop, Prime Minister Dr Roosevelt Skerrit emphasised the country's determination to rebuild, famously stating, "We are going to build back better, stronger, and more resilient." Central to this commitment was a pledge to provide each family affected by these natural disasters with a climate-resilient home.

To realise this vision, Dominica leveraged its Citizenship by Investment (CBI) programme, a mechanism designed to attract foreign investments in exchange for granting citizenship, directing a significant portion of these funds towards the housing initiative.

Driven by this funding mechanism, the government of Dominica set forth an ambitious goal of constructing over 5,000 climate-resilient homes, intended to be provided to the impacted families free of cost. Demonstrating marked progress towards this commitment, the Government has already completed and transferred ownership of over 2,000 such houses to affected families across the nation.

A series of housing projects have been initiated to address the needs of various communities across the island. These projects span several locations, including Bellevue Chopin, Cotton Hill, East Coast, Georgetown, Grand Bay, Jimmit, Stockfarm, Roseau Upper River Bank, Joe Burton, Scotts Head, Eggleston, Grand Bay Ville, Paix Bouche, Canefield, Vieille Case, Pointe Michel, Woodford Hill, and Penville. Each of these housing developments reflects the Government's commitment to ensuring adequate and resilient accommodations for its residents.

=== Healthcare ===
While initially established to stimulate economic growth and infrastructure development, the CBI Programme has played an instrumental role in transforming the country's health sector. The robust financial inflow from this Programme enabled the Government of Dominica to embark on a comprehensive mission to bolster healthcare services and accessibility across the island.

As a result, the Government commissioned the construction of over 12 healthcare centres, strategically located in various regions to ensure optimal accessibility for its citizens. These centres, situated in Ansé De Mai, Bagatelle, Bellevue Chopin, Colihaut, Georgetown, Mahaut, Marigot, Newtown, Penville, Soufriere, Vieille Case, and Wesley, aim to deliver top-notch medical services and play a vital role in decentralising healthcare provisions.

In addition to these centres, a significant milestone in Dominica's healthcare transformation journey was the establishment of the state-of-the-art Marigot Hospital which started functioning in September 2023 in a phased manner. Furnished with modern amenities and designed to offer a wide range of medical services. This focus on healthcare, fuelled by the CBI programme, highlights Dominica's dedication to the well-being of its populace, setting a precedent for other nations to harness alternative financial mechanisms for national development.

=== Education ===
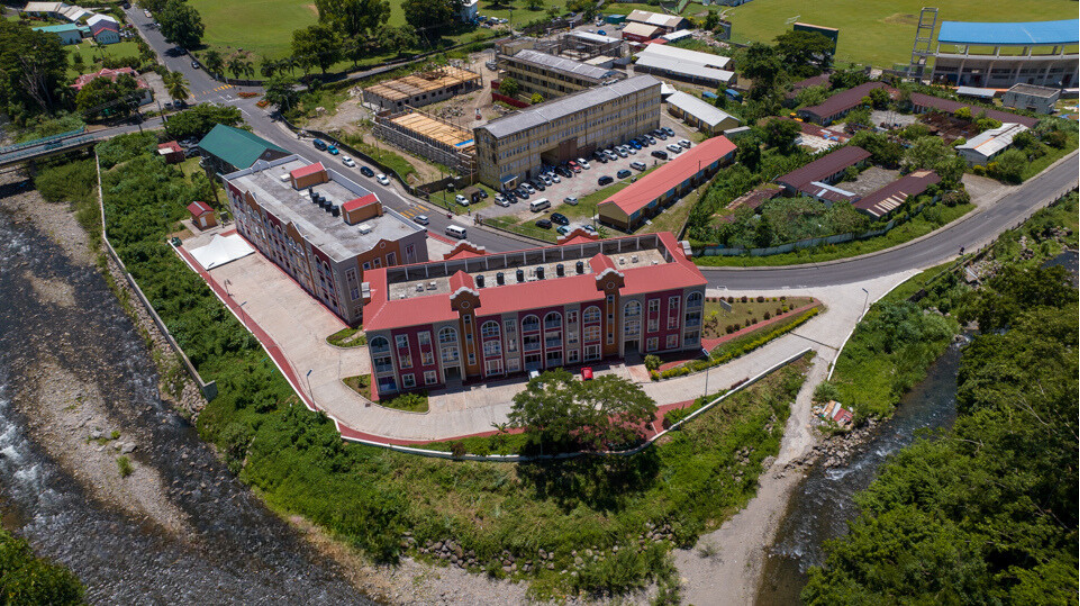
School In Dominica

Dominica is taking active steps to update and fortify its educational infrastructure, starting with two key institutions: Mahaut Primary School and Dominica Grammar School. These schools are set to be transformed into climate-resilient structures, ensuring the safety and well-being of students against environmental challenges. This initiative aims not just at structural robustness but also at enhancing the overall educational experience for the Dominican youth.

The funding for these modernisations is sourced from the CBI Programme. With this support, the revamped schools will have spacious classrooms and modern facilities, including advanced laboratories, multimedia rooms, theatres, and recreational areas. These upgrades signify Dominica's commitment to providing its youth with a comprehensive and secure educational environment.

=== Dominica International Airport ===
The establishment of the Dominica International Airport was an ambitious project. Significantly funded by the Citizenship by Investment Programme.

The airport is designed to accommodate long-haul flights, a critical feature that aims to open Dominica to a broader spectrum of international markets and streamline its access for global travellers.

While in the past, visitors to Dominica often had to rely on connecting flights from nearby Caribbean islands, the new international airport promises direct accessibility from major global hubs including US, Europe and other regions. This infrastructure development is anticipated to boost tourism, facilitate business operations, and provide Dominicans with more direct routes to international destinations.

Additionally, the project underscores Dominica's commitment to sustainable development by considering environmental best practices in its construction and operation, solidifying its position as a forward-thinking nation in the region.

=== COVID-19 Relief Packages ===
While the primary objective of the CBI Programme has been economic and infrastructural development, during the pandemic, it became a lifeline for many residents, providing essential support when most needed.

The Government, harnessing the funds from the CBI Programme, initiated the distribution of "COVID-19 Care Packages" to its citizens during lockdown periods, ensuring that they had access to essential supplies without the added stress of financial constraints.

These care packages were comprehensive, aiming to cater to the immediate needs of the population and also support local industries. They included a range of items like agricultural produce, essential food items, fresh fish, and fruits. The Government also provided the following:

- Financial assistance: The Government provided financial assistance to businesses and individuals who were affected by the pandemic. This assistance included grants, loans, and tax breaks.
- Food security: The Government provided food assistance to vulnerable households. This assistance included food baskets and vouchers.
- Health care: The Government invested in healthcare to improve the country's response to the pandemic. This investment included expanding testing and treatment capacity.

== Legal Basis ==
The Dominican Constitution mandates that Parliament provide for the acquisition of citizenship of Dominica by persons who are not, or who are no longer, otherwise entitled to such citizenship under the remaining provisions of the Constitution.

In 1978, the Commonwealth of Dominica Citizenship Act addressed the matter of such acquisition by the granting of a naturalisation certificate, in sections 8 and 9 of the Act.

The regulations currently governing the Dominica Citizenship by Investment Programme are the 4. Commonwealth of Dominica Citizenship by Investment Act 2014 and subsequent amendments.

== Report by PricewaterhouseCoopers ==
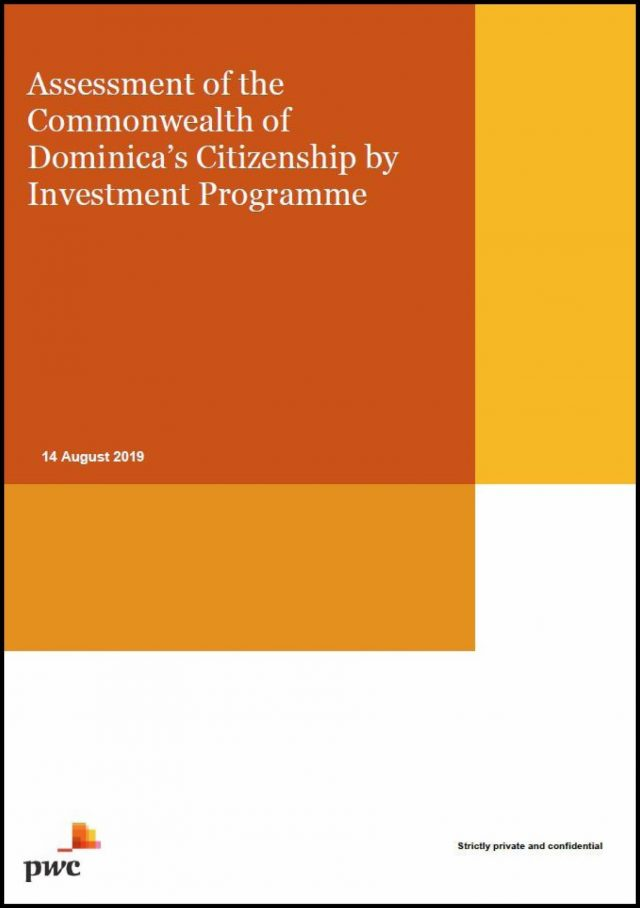
PwC-Report of Dominica

In 2019, PricewaterhouseCoopers (PwC) published a comprehensive report on the impact of Dominica's Citizenship by Investment (CBI) Programme. The report found that the programme has made significant contributions to the country's economic and social development since its inception in 1993.

=== Economic impact ===
The PwC report found that the CBI Programme has had a positive impact on Dominica's GDP, with tangible benefits seen in infrastructure development, tourism, and other key sectors. In 2018, the programme contributed an estimated 26% to Dominica's GDP.

The report outlines that the CBI Programme has played a vital role in funding public sector projects, including the construction of new schools, hospitals, and roads. Additionally, the programme's proceeds have been used to support disaster recovery efforts, especially post-Hurricane Maria in 2017.

=== Social impact ===
The PwC report also found that the CBI Programme has had a positive impact on Dominica's society. The programme has created job opportunities for locals, both directly and indirectly. Additionally, the CBI Programme has helped to promote Dominica's culture and heritage to the world.

The PwC report concluded that the continued success and sustainability of the CBI Programme are vital for Dominica's socio-economic advancement.

=== Due diligence ===
The PwC report also emphasized that Dominica's CBI Programme stands out for its robust due diligence processes. These rigorous processes ensure that only credible individuals are granted citizenship.

Dominica's CBI Programme has been praised for its transparency and accountability. The programme is subject to regular audits by independent third parties. Additionally, the CBI Programme is overseen by a government-appointed committee, which includes representatives from the private sector and civil society.

The PwC report concluded that Dominica's CBI Programme is a well-run and responsible programme that has made significant contributions to the country's development.

== International Reports ==
In 2019, two major reports were published on the relationship between tax evasion and Citizenship by Investment Programmes (CBI), including Dominica's CBI Programme. The reports were published by Ernst & Young (EY) and Smith & Williamson.

=== Ernst & Young Report ===
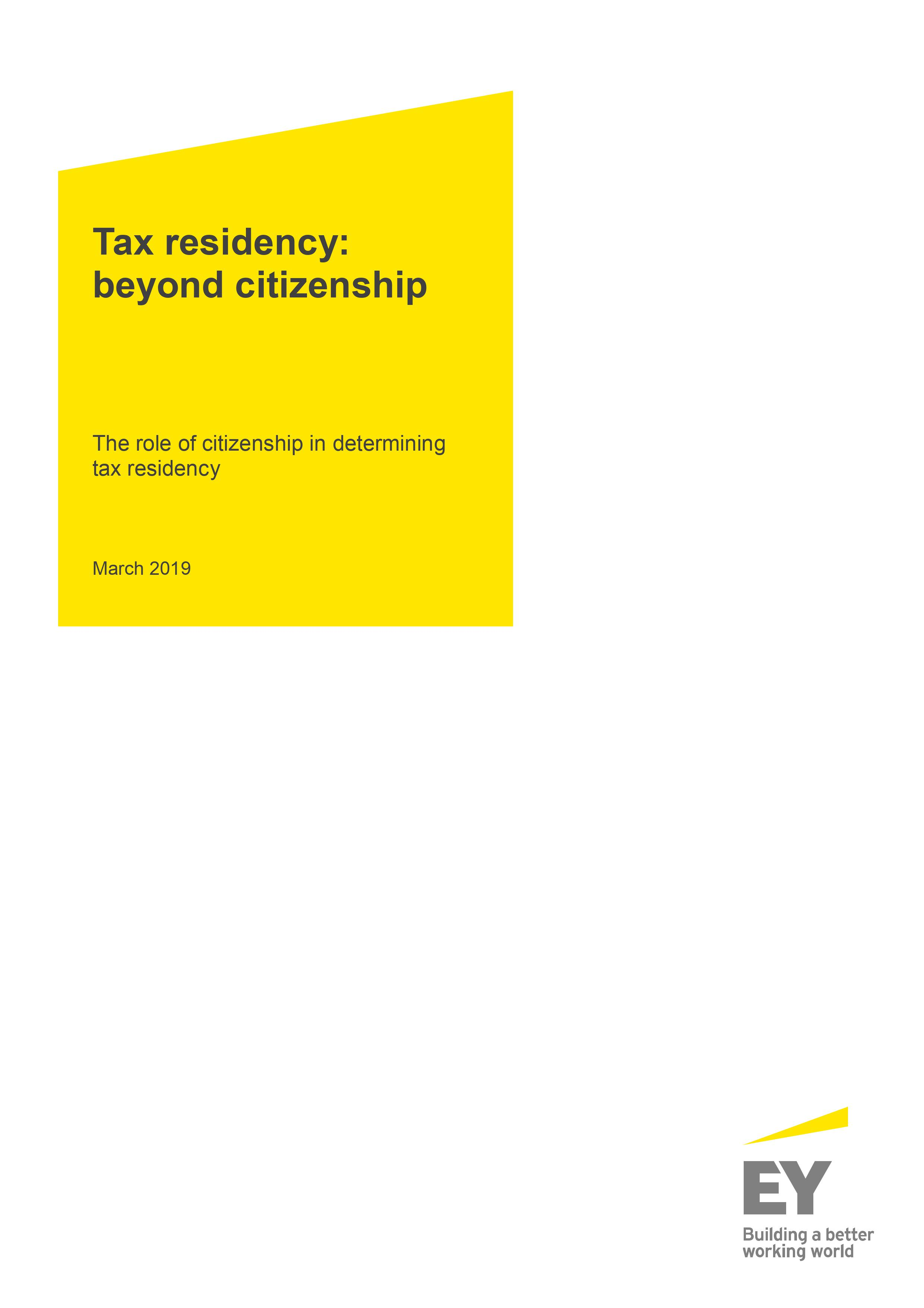
Tax Residency Beyond Citizenship

The EY report, titled "Tax Residency: Beyond Citizenship", concluded that the Dominica CBI Programme does not facilitate tax evasion. The report noted that citizenship and tax residency are two distinct concepts, and that citizenship alone is insufficient to secure tax residency of a country.

The EY report also noted that Dominica is a party to the Common Reporting Standard (CRS), which is an international agreement that requires countries to exchange information about their residents' financial accounts (The Common Reporting Standard (CRS) was developed in response to the G20 request and approved by the OECD Council on 15 July 2014.).

This means that if a Dominican CBI participant attempts to evade taxes in their home country, the Dominican government will be obligated to report their financial information to their home country's tax authorities.

=== Smith & Williamson Report ===
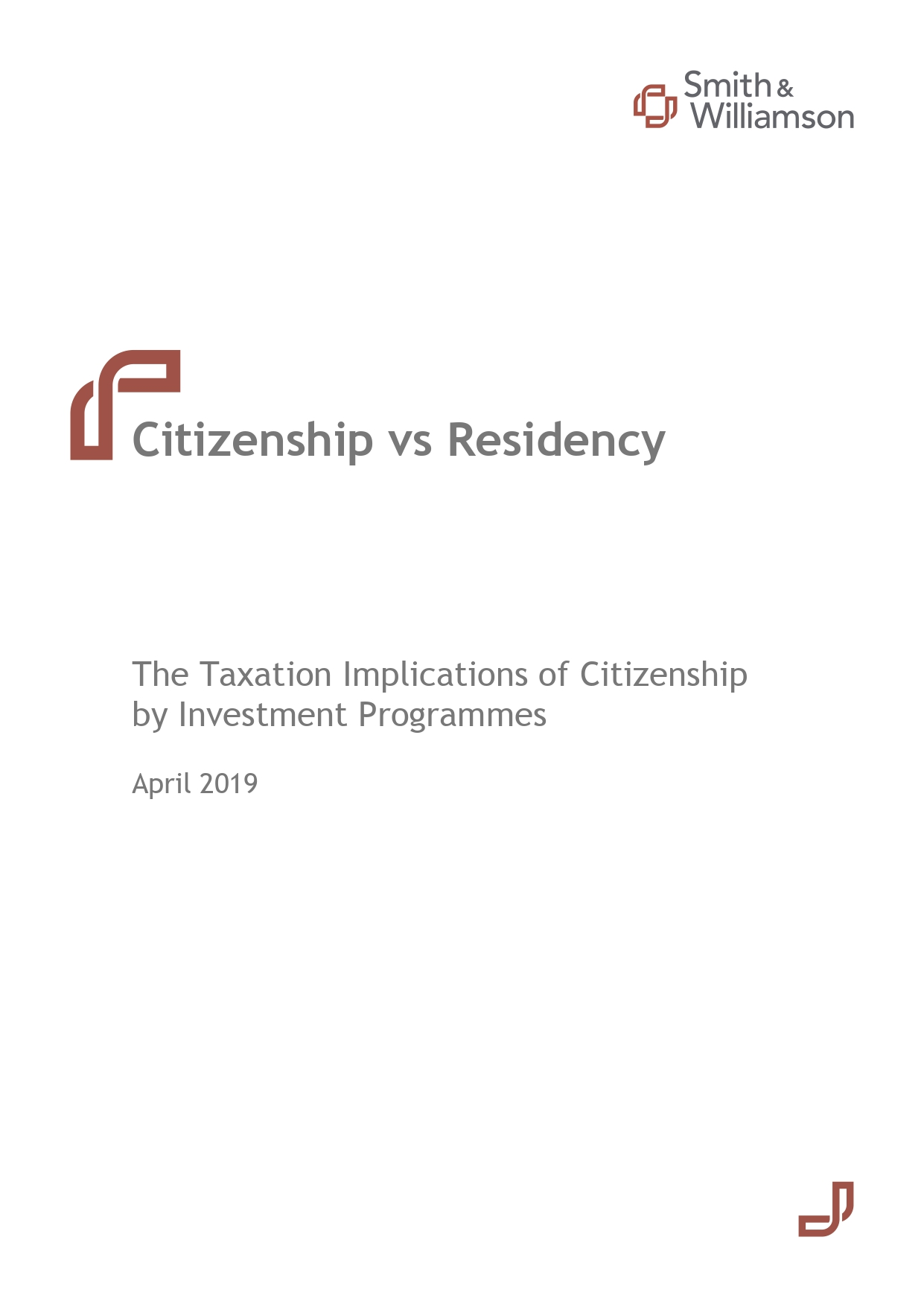
Citizenship vs Residency: The Taxation Implications of Citizenship by Investment Programme.jpg

The Smith & Williamson report, titled "Citizenship vs Residency: The Taxation Implications of Citizenship by Investment Programmes", also concluded that CBI programmes do not present a risk to facilitating tax evasion. The report noted that citizenship is a concept distinct from tax residency, and that individuals are only liable to tax in countries where they are tax resident.

The Smith & Williamson report also noted that CBI programmes typically have stringent due diligence procedures in place to ensure that applicants are not involved in illegal activities, including tax evasion.

The EY and Smith & Williamson reports says that Dominica's CBI Programme does not facilitate tax evasion. The reports also highlight the importance of distinguishing between citizenship and tax residency, and the role of international agreements such as the CRS in preventing tax evasion.

== Citizenship by Investment Index (CBI Index) Ranking (2017 – 2023) ==
=== CBI Index 2017: Overall Rank 1 ===
- Freedom of Movement: Rank 4 (7 out of 10 marks)
- Standard of Living: Rank 3 (7 out of 10 marks)
- Min Investment Outlay: Rank 1 (10 out of 10 marks)
- Mandatory Travel/Residence: Rank 1 (10 out of 10 marks)
- Ease of Processing: Rank 1 (10 out of 10 marks)
- Citizenship Timeline: Rank 2 (9 out of 10 marks)
- Due Diligence: Rank 1 (10 out of 10 marks)
- Overall: Rank 1 (63 out of 70 marks)

=== CBI Index 2018: Overall Rank 1 ===
- Freedom of Movement: Rank 4 (7 out of 10 marks)
- Standard of Living: Rank 4 (6 out of 10 marks)
- Min Investment Outlay: Rank 1 (10 out of 10 marks)
- Mandatory Travel/Residence: Rank 1 (10 out of 10 marks)
- Citizenship Timeline: Rank 1 (10 out of 10 marks)
- Ease of Processing: Rank 1 (10 out of 10 marks)
- Due Diligence: Rank 1 (10 out of 10 marks)
- Overall: Rank 1 (63 out of 70 marks)

=== CBI Index 2019: Overall Rank 1 ===
- Freedom of Movement: Rank 4 (7 out of 10 marks)
- Standard of Living: Rank 4 (6 out of 10 marks)
- Min Investment Outlay: Rank 1 (10 marks out of 10 marks)
- Mandatory Travel/Residence: Rank 1 (10 out of marks)
- Citizenship Timeline: Rank 1 (10 out of 10 marks)
- Ease of Processing: Rank 1 (10 out of 10 marks)
- Due Diligence: Rank 1 (10 out of 10 marks)
- Overall: Rank 1 (63 out of 70 marks)

=== CBI Index 2020: Overall Rank 1 ===
- Freedom of Movement: Rank 4 (6 out of 10 marks)
- Standard of Living: Rank 4 (6 out of 10 marks)
- Minimum Investment Outlay: Rank 1 (10 out of 10 marks)
- Mandatory Travel/Residence: Rank 1 (10 out of 10 marks)
- Citizenship Timeline: Rank 2 (9 out of 10 marks)
- Ease of Processing: Rank 1 (10 out of 10 marks)
- Due Diligence: Rank 1 (10 out of 10 marks)
- Family: Rank 1 (10 out of 10 marks)
- Certainty of Product: Rank 1 (10 out of 10 marks)
- Overall: Rank 1 (81 out of 90 marks)

=== CBI Index 2021: Overall Rank 1 ===
- Freedom of Movement: Rank 4 (6 out of 10 marks)
- Standard of Living: Rank 5 (5 out of 10 marks)
- Minimum Investment Outlay: Rank 1 (10 out of 10 marks)
- Mandatory Travel/Residence: Rank 1 (10 out of 10 marks)
- Citizenship Timeline: Rank 2 (9 out of 10 marks)
- Ease of Processing: Rank 1 (10 out of 10 marks)
- Due Diligence: Rank 1 (10 out of 10 marks)
- Family: Rank 1 (10 out of 10 marks)
- Certainty of Product: Rank 1 (10 out of 10 marks)
- Overall: Rank 1 (80 out of 90 marks)

=== CBI Index 2022: Overall Rank 1 ===
- Freedom of Movement: Rank 2 (7 out of 10 marks)
- Standard of Living: Rank 4 (5 out of 10 marks)
- Minimum Investment Outlay: Rank 1 (10 out of 10 marks)
- Mandatory Travel/Residence: Rank 1 (10 marks out of 10 marks)
- Citizenship Timeline: Rank 2 (9 out of 10 marks)
- Ease of Process: Rank 1 (10 out of 10 marks)
- Due Diligence: Rank 1 (10 out of 10 marks)
- Family: Rank 1 (10 out of 10 marks)
- Certainty of Product: Rank 1 (10 out of 10 marks)
- Overall: Rank 1 (81 out of 90 marks)

=== CBI Index 2023: Overall Rank 2 ===
- Standard of Living: Rank 3 (6 out of 10 marks)
- Freedom of Movement: Rank 2 (7 out of 10 marks)
- Minimum Investment Outlay: Rank 1 (10 out of 10 marks)
- Mandatory Travel: Rank 1 (10 out of 10 marks)
- Citizenship timeline: Rank 1 (9 out of 10 marks)
- Ease of Processing: Rank 1 (10 out of 10 marks)
- Due diligence: Rank 2 (9 out of 10 marks)
- Family: Rank 3 (8 out of 10 marks)
- Certainty of Product: Rank 2 (7 out of 10 marks)
- Overall: Rank 2 (75 out of 90 marks)

== Operations ==
The Dominica Citizenship by Investment Programme is administered by the Citizenship by Investment Unit, a Government office established under section three of the 2014 Regulations. The Citizenship by Investment Unit, commonly known as the Unit or the CBIU, processes all applications for citizenship by investment, and commissions due diligence reports on each applicant.

Due diligence is performed by one or more independent professional firms, and a due diligence fee is collected for this purpose. Additionally, information on applicants is sent to the Caribbean Community (CARICOM)’s Implementing Agency for Crime and Security (IMPACS), which in turn vets applicants through Interpol and governmental databases.

The Unit is bound by regulation to determine whether an application is approved in principle, denied, or delayed for cause and still being processed within at most three months of receipt of the application, ensuring a maximum timeframe for applications.

== Effects ==
The Dominica Citizenship by Investment Programme is directly responsible for the funding of major development work in Dominica. In his Budget Address for 2016-2017, Prime Minister Roosevelt Skerrit said “we may ask the question ‘why is the Citizenship by Investment Programme so important?’ The response is clear; in an age where development finance is dwindling and the process of gaining access to available financing is becoming more onerous, governments the world over must find credible ways and means of raising financing for development programmes. The alternative would be to increase domestic taxes and or contract loans.” Such development programmes included the Roseau Enhancement Project, infrastructural work at the Douglas Charles International Airport, and rehabilitation works in response to Tropical Storm Erika, which caused widespread damage to Dominica in August 2015. In an interview with the Huffington Post released in February 2016, Vince Henderson, then Permanent Representative of Dominica to the United Nations, characterised the Programme as a “lifeline” in the wake of the storm. Following category five Hurricane Maria, which made landfall in September 2017 and affected over 92 percent of Dominica's population, it is expected the Citizenship by Investment Programme will continue to provide sustenance and support to Dominica in its restoration efforts, as the Unit reported "business as usual" days after the hurricane.
