= CARICOM passport =

Passport

There is no single "CARICOM passport"; each one of the 15 member states of the Caribbean Community (CARICOM) issues its own national passport independently to its citizens - though, since 2005, most of these national passports now bring the name "CARICOM" on the cover next to the country's name, similarly to what is also done by European Union members. They can be used both for intra-regional and international travel. Citizens of the OECS that are citizens from Antigua and Barbuda, Dominica, Grenada, St. Kitts and Nevis, Saint Lucia, Guyana and St. Vincent and the Grenadines do not need to use any passport to travel from one of these countries to the other, as they may use a member-state issued drivers licence, national identification card, voters registration card or social security card for travel within the OECS area.

== History ==
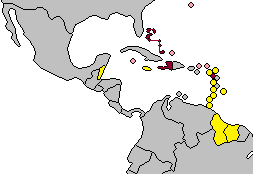
Members with common passport implemented Members without common passport Associate members

On Friday, 7 January 2005, the Republic of Suriname became the first full member state to officially launch the new bloc "CARICOM Passport". The new passports boast having better security and are also machine-readable. The full member states of the Caribbean Community had agreed to establish a common passport in order to make intra-regional and international travel easier for their citizens. The passports are also thought to save additional costs for member states by using a similar cover design, the designs will also follow newly updated international standards on passport design.

The second state to release the national CARICOM passport was Saint Vincent and the Grenadines: SVG began issuing the new CARICOM passports around April 2005. On 25 October 2005, St. Kitts and Nevis became the third CARICOM member state to bring the CARICOM passport into operation, making good on its promise to launch it before the end of the year and began issuance of the document to its citizens on 14 November 2005.

Antigua and Barbuda announced that it would begin using the new CARICOM passport format by the middle of 2005.

St. Lucia proposed introducing the common passport in early 2007 and introduced it on 16 January 2007.

Trinidad and Tobago announced that it would begin to issue the new CARICOM passport in June 2006, and then indicated that it would introduce the passport in July 2006 along with Guyana, but only introduced the passport on 24 January 2007.

Grenada planned to begin issuing the common passport in mid-2006, but started issuing them on 29 January 2007.

Barbados had planned to switch to the common format by late 2006, but then proposed to introduce it by 31 December 2007. Barbados launched the new common-format passport on 1 October 2007.

Guyana had also announced that it would begin to use the new CARICOM passport format by the middle of 2005, but the introduction was delayed and the new target date was set to July 2006. However, Guyana eventually officially launched the passport on 13 July 2007.

Jamaica was expected to institute the passport by the end of 2007; however, this deadline lapsed, and Jamaica was then expected to introduce the passport by January 2009, finally launching the passport on 2 January 2009.

Belize was expected to introduce the passport by 31 December 2007 after its current stock was depleted, but ultimately Belize introduced the passport on 17 March 2009. In doing so Belize became the twelfth and last country in the CSM to introduce the passport and its introduction was the reason why Belizeans had been having trouble renewing or obtaining new passports as the Belizean Ministry of Immigration and National Security awaited the arrival of a shipment of the new travel documents.

== The CARICOM Common Passport ==
As of early 2009, twelve Member States had introduced CARICOM passports. These states are: Antigua and Barbuda, Barbados, Belize, Dominica, Grenada, Guyana, Jamaica, St. Kitts and Nevis, St. Lucia, St. Vincent and the Grenadines, Suriname and Trinidad and Tobago. CARICOM members who have not yet issued the common passport are the Bahamas and Montserrat. As Montserrat is a British Overseas Territory, citizens of Montserrat became full citizens of the United Kingdom in 2002, and so a common passport is unlikely to be introduced for them.

The CARICOM passport creates awareness that CARICOM nationals are nationals of the Community, as well as a specific country.

=== Passport designs ===
The passports of all members have the same colour scheme:

- Dark blue for civilians,
- Green for government officials, and
- Red for diplomats.

In the case of Suriname, the passport is adorned with the national symbols for the Republic of Suriname, as well as the CARICOM insignia on its cover. President of the Republic of Suriname Ronald Venetiaan received the first of these new CARICOM passports.

Antigua and Barbuda's design is to feature the country's coat of arms and country name, as well as the CARICOM logo.

The passports for Suriname were created by the Canadian Banknote Company Ltd (CBN) under a five-year programme with a price tag of US$1.5 million. It is believed other member states of CARICOM will now soon follow with the introduction of their own branded version of the national 'CARICOM' passport.

=== Future introduction(s) ===
The expectation was that all the member states would have introduced the CARICOM passport by 2008 when the stock of their old passports is depleted. This deadline was missed by a year, and by 2009 all CSME participating states had introduced the common passport design.

The Bahamas has not launched the machine-readable passport, and instead launched the e-passport on 5 December 2007.

Montserrat is not expected to change the design of its passport because the island is a British overseas territory.

== Passport ranking ==
CARICOM Passport rankings by the number of countries and territories their holders could visit without a visa or by obtaining visa on arrival in 2023 were as follows:

Ranking	Country or territory	Number of destinations
1	Barbados	165
2	(The Bahamas) Bahamas	159
3	Saint Kitts and Nevis	157
3	Saint Vincent and the Grenadines	157
4	Antigua and Barbuda	153
5	Trinidad and Tobago	151
6	Saint Lucia	148
7	Grenada	147
8	Dominica	144
9	Belize	104
10	Guyana	89
10	Jamaica	89
11	Suriname	79
12	Haiti	52

== See also ==
- Tourism in the Caribbean
- Caribbean Community (CARICOM)
  - CARIPASS
  - CARICOM Single Market and Economy
- Central America-4 passport
- Commonwealth citizen
- Pan-African Payment and Settlement System
- African Union Passport

== Notes ==
- "'What purpose does the Caricom passport serve?'". Jamaica Observer. 30 January 2013. Archived from the original on 3 February 2013.
