= Tourism in Latin America and the Caribbean =

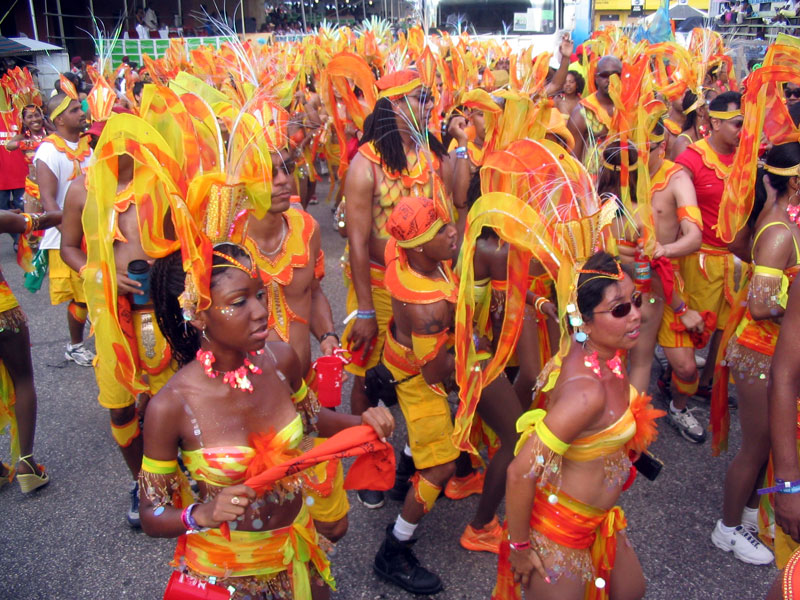
Orange Carnival Masqueraders in Trinidad

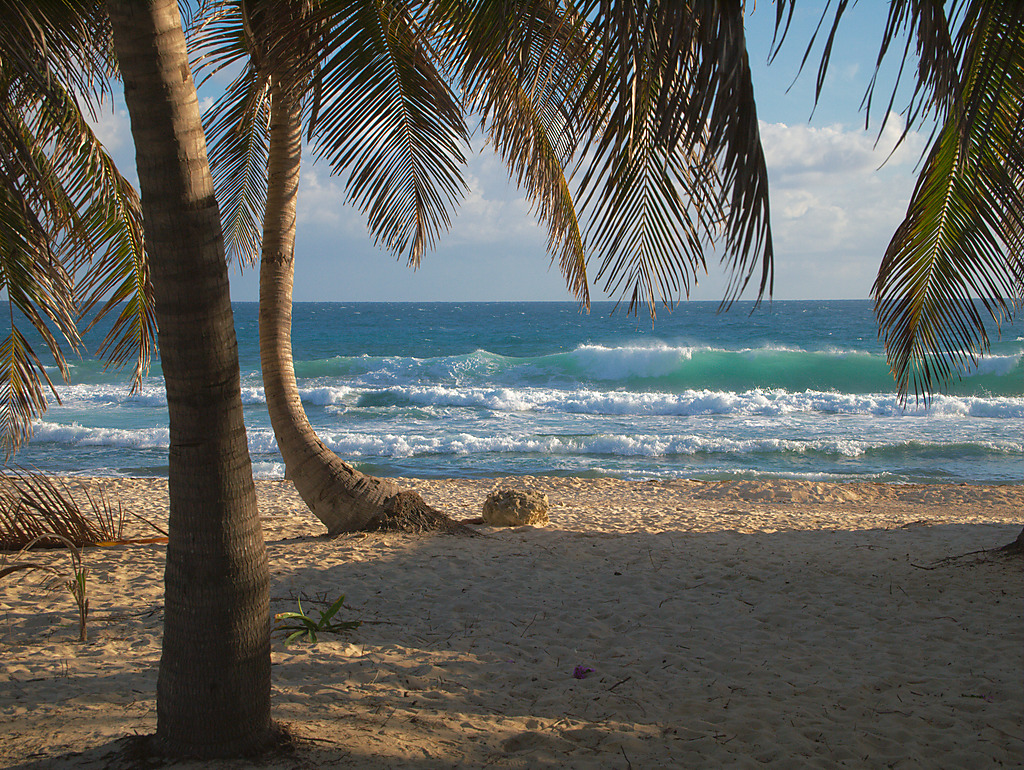
Beach on the Caribbean side of Isla Mujeres

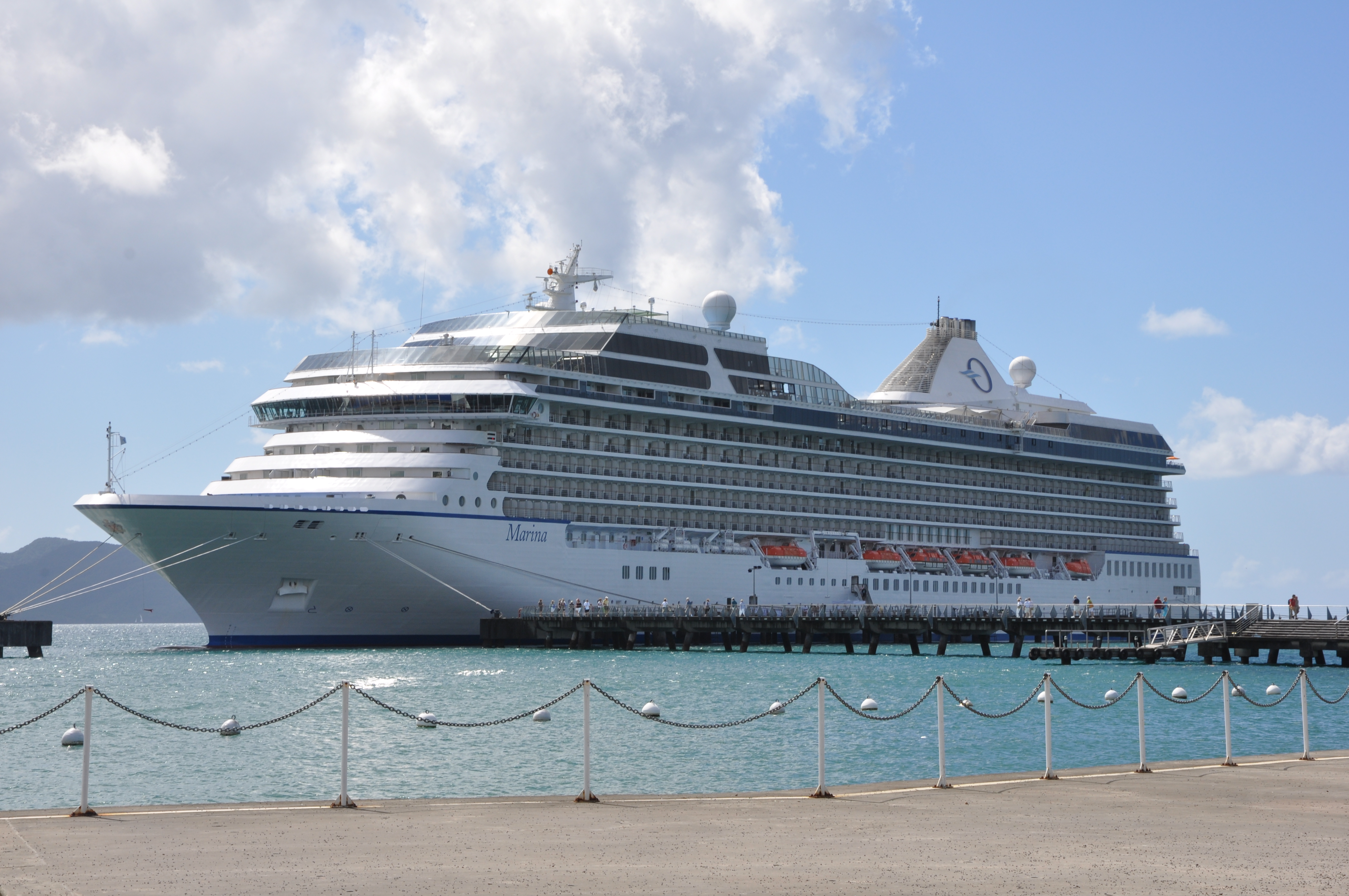
MS Marina docked at Martinique

Tourism is one of the Caribbean's major economic sectors, with 25 million visitors contributing $49 billion towards the area's gross domestic product in 2013, which represented 14% of its total GDP. It is often described as, "the most tourism-dependent region in the world".

The first hotel was built on the island of Nevis in 1778 and brought wealthy visitors, such as Samuel Taylor Coleridge. In the 19th century, resort hotels were also built on The Bahamas, Jamaica and Barbados to support an increasing tourist trade. Tourism increased dramatically when airplanes transported tourists to the region. This increased the numbers of people that were able to afford to vacation on the islands, but required costly infrastructure development.

== History ==
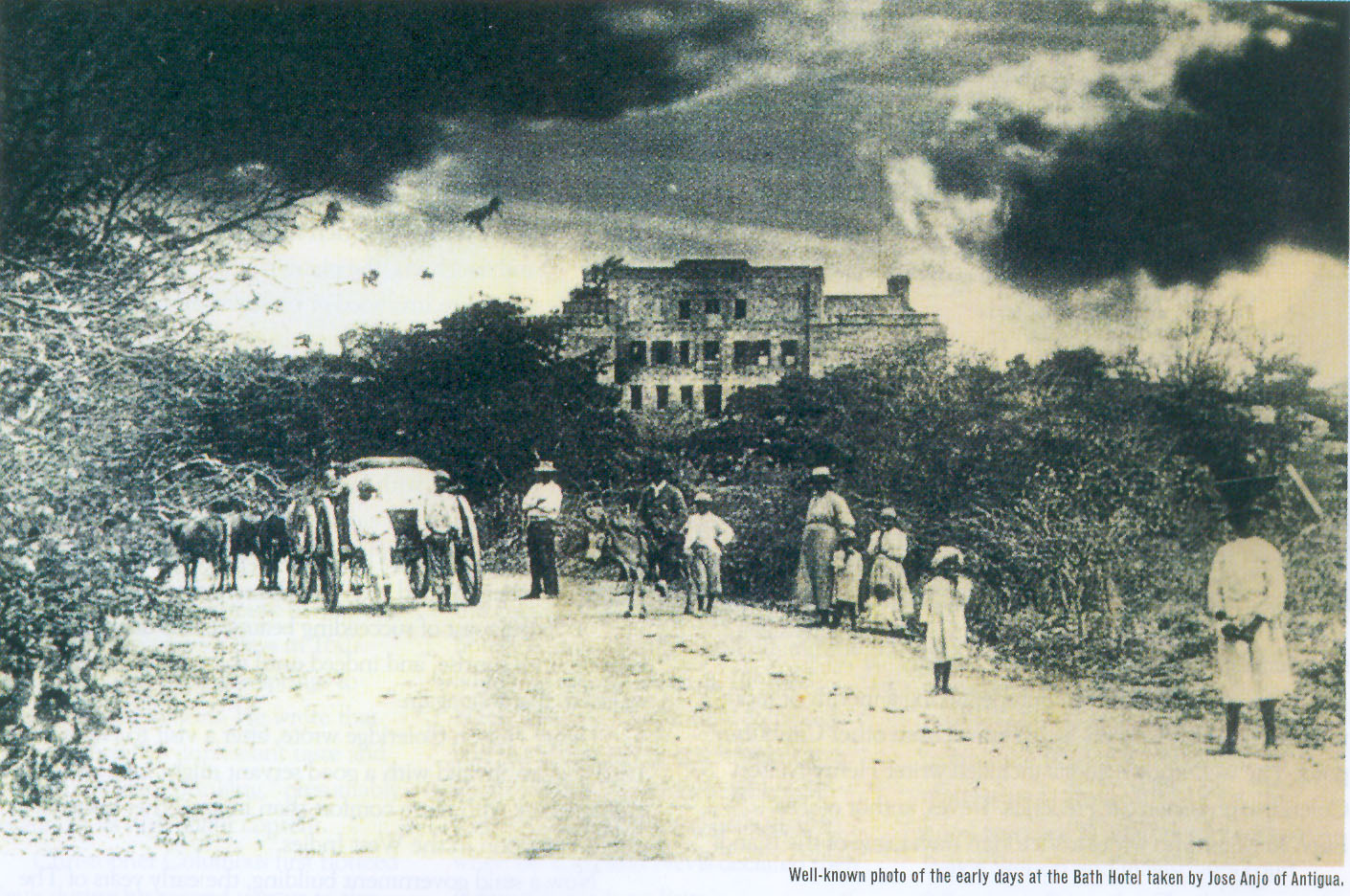
Bath Hotel, Nevis, photograph by Jose Anjo of Antigua

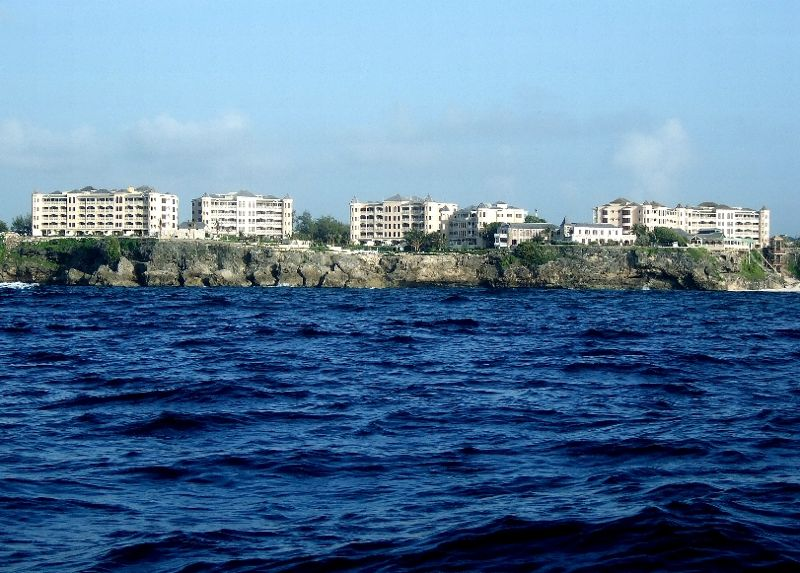
Crane Resort old and new buildings, Cobblers Reef, Barbados

The early seaside resorts were developed primarily for curative benefits of bathing (Note: Early tourists avoided exposure to the sun, since wealthy people were distinguished by light skin since they did not work in the sun and also believed there were ill effects of being in the sun, and did not have bathing suits. So, they bathed naked in the sea during the early morning or late afternoon and under shaded structures, like gazebos, verandas, and covered walkways.) in the sea and breathing the warm, ozone-laden air. Lawrence Washington (1718–1752) and his younger half-brother George Washington stayed at the Bush Hill House in Barbados in 1751 for two months to treat Lawrence's tuberculosis. According to an anthropologist, Barbados was referred to as the "sanatorium of the West Indies" in guidebooks because of its fresh water, sea air, and absence of malaria.

The Bath Hotel and the Spring House was created of stone along Bath Stream in 1778 on the island of Nevis. It was the first official hotel to open in the Caribbean. The mineral hot springs and the hotel attracted visitors such as Prince William Henry, Lord Nelson and Samuel Taylor Coleridge. The Royal Victorian Hotel in the Bahamas opened in 1861, Crane Beach in Barbados opened in 1887, and the Jamaican Titchfield Hotel was another early one. By 1900, eleven or more steamships had regular routes to Barbados. In the 19th century, wealthy European tourists traveled across the Atlantic during the winter months for weeks or months at a time. The Caribbean islands were colonies of European countries, and early tourists went to their nation's colonies. Barbados and Jamaica were visited by the English, Curaçao by the Dutch, and Martinique by the French. American tourists traveled to The Bahamas and Cuba.

In the 1920s, tourists visited the Caribbean for pleasurable, sun-bathing vacations. Sun exposure was considered healthy at that time and tans were a symbol of "spontaneity and sensuality" among the wealthy. Before World War II, more than 100,000 tourists visited the region a year.

Tourism became an economically important industry as Caribbean bananas, sugar, and bauxite were no longer competitively priced with the advent of free-trade policies. Encouraged by the United Nations and World Bank, many governments in the Caribbean encouraged tourism beginning in the 1950s to boost their third-world economies. The Caribbean Tourist Association was founded in 1951. Tax incentives encouraged foreign development of hotels and infrastructure, cultivated by newly formed tourism ministries.

Regular non-stop international airplane flights in the 1960s made vacations to the Caribbean more affordable and increased the number of visitors. Visitors from Europe could travel there in eight hours, whereas it used to take three weeks by ship. After World War II, the expanding middle class had more time and money for vacations and travel agencies sold affordable vacation packages to the Caribbean. Friendly native people, a warm climate, very few pests or disease, and natural beauty made it an attractive holiday option. In addition, people could also select islands based upon the language spoken: Spanish, French, Dutch or English. In 1959, 1.3 million people vacationed in the Caribbean, and by 1965 the number of visitors had risen to nearly 4 million per year.

Multinational hotel chains and tour operators began operating. Tourism became a significant industry by 1985 when 10 million people vacationed on the islands. Islands that had relied on oil production for their revenue, like Trinidad and Tobago, and Aruba, did not vigorously promote tourism until revenues from oil declined in the 1990s. In 2007, the number of annual tourists rose to 17 million people.

== Economy ==
Tourism is one of the region's major economic sectors, with 25 million visitors contributing $49 billion towards the area's gross domestic product in 2013, which represented 14% of its total GDP. This puts the region twelfth in the world in terms of tourism's absolute contribution to GDP, but first as a proportion of GDP. In terms of employment, 11.3% of the region's jobs depend on tourism either directly or indirectly. It is often described as "the most tourism-dependent region in the world".

Caribbean islands now depend on tourism for their economy, it being referred to as "the engine of their growth". Tourism is a huge contributor to the economies of all Caribbean countries and the biggest contributor to many of them such as Antigua and Barbuda, Bahamas and the Virgin Islands. It provides a steady revenue stream, with temporary blips due to hurricanes or recessions in the Western world and supports local farming, fishing, and retail industries. Barbados, for instance, has moved from a primarily agricultural economy to a service-based economy that supports tourism. By 2006, tourism brought in ten times more to the Barbados economy than sugar cane production, $167 million versus $14.5 billion.

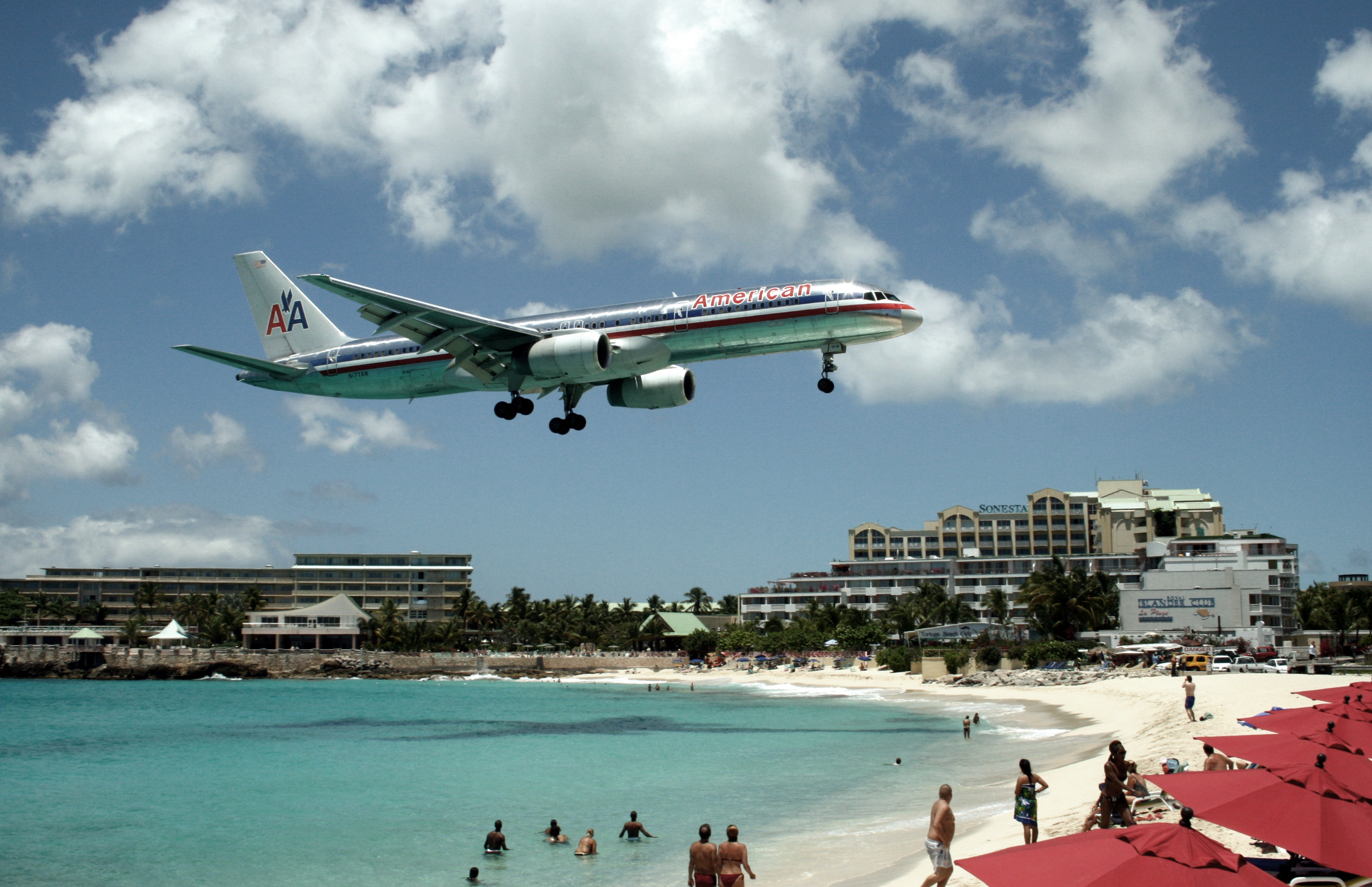
American 757 on final approach to Saint Maarten Airport

Besides hotels and restaurants, services to tourism have required additional infrastructure, including: airports, roads, sewage treatment plants, landfills, electricity supply and telephones.

Much of the profit from tourism is earned by corporations outside of the Caribbean since, "two-thirds of the hotel rooms in the region are foreign owned, and the tour companies who arrange visitor's activities are often foreign owned". The more luxurious the accommodations, the more likely that profits are made by foreign firms. Further, many resorts are all-inclusive, and vacationers of these resorts rarely eat out at locally owned restaurants, rent water sports gear from local entrepreneurs, or arrange island tours with local taxis. Most of the food served at hotels is imported, locally grown fruit, such as breadfruit, bananas, mangos, and citrus is rarely served. Only about 30% of money spent by foreign visitors remains in the Caribbean, the rest is retained by overseas firms.

Tourism development has driven up the cost of food and land, land which may be purchased for hotel, marina, and other tourist facility development by companies able to afford the price. If they have a home, they may be pushed out of their residence due to the high cost of living or hotel construction.

Today some West Indians are seeing features of the colonial situation resurrected by tourism. Locals are denied access to their own beaches, the best jobs go to non-nationals or those with the lightest skin, and humble service roles and low-wage jobs predominate in the tourism sector.

— George Gmelch, 2012

== Attractions ==
Tourist attraction of the region are those generally associated with a maritime tropical climate: Scuba diving and snorkeling on coral reefs, cruises, sailing, and game fishing at sea. On land; golf, botanical gardens, parks, limestone caves, wildlife reserves, hiking, cycling and horseback riding. Cultural attractions include Carnival, steel bands, reggae and cricket. Due to the dispersal of the islands, helicopter or aeroplane tours are popular. Specific to this tropical region are tours of historic colonial plantation houses, sugar mills and rum distilleries. Caribbean cuisine is a fusion of cooking styles, goat stew being the signature dish of several islands. Marijuana has developed in importance since the 19th century, becoming a significant part of Jamaican culture.

A large number of the visitors are honeymooners or people who come to the islands for a destination wedding. Tour operators use oblique references to sex tourism to attract customers.

The recent studies shows that some Caribbean islands, like Cuba, Hispaniola, Jamaica, and Puerto Rico has a huge potential for mountaineering activity, however, it is not utilized properly.

== Cultural impacts ==
Some historians and cultural anthropologists say the changes to the islands to support tourism have negatively impacted the indigenous cultures of the Caribbean. David Bennett's article, "Global tourism and Caribbean culture" offers examples in which tourism and globalization create an inauthentic culture that caters more to the tourists than the indigenous heritage. This is further morphed by mass media influences, such as television and the Internet. Trinidad's traditional carnival has become an inauthentic commercialized event used to lure tourists for economic gain. Historically, the festival emphasized a mythological basis, demonstrating the holy trinity and the nation's unity. Similarly, mass-market cruise lines have been criticized for strategically deploying selective cultural symbols that obscure the region’s diversity, reinforcing Eurocentric perspectives and delivering a sanitized, easily digestible cultural experience that prioritizes tourist comfort over local representation. According to Dennis Merrill, author of "Negotiating Cold War Paradise: U.S. Tourism, Economic Planning, and Cultural Modernity in Twentieth-Century Puerto Rico", the tourism industry in the Caribbean is viewed by its critics as causing host countries to practice economic subservience to the visitors of the islands. He highlights the U.S. attempt in the 1930s to make Puerto Rico an island destination for tourists to bring in a new source of revenue to the U.S. and help lift it out of economic depression. Travel guides and advertisements used at the time suggested that the people of Puerto Rico lived in poverty and wanted a chance to serve travelers from the United States.

The creation of the Caribe Hilton Hotel in San Juan in 1949 represented a partnership between the Puerto Rican government and U.S business. Americans viewed the creation of the hotel as a symbol of their power to create material progress. A majority of Puerto Rican citizens did not approve of the decision to build the hotel. They believed that the public funds would have better suited the island inhabitants if they were invested in improving education and social welfare. San Juan's fire chief of the time disapproved the government's decision to "degrade itself by buying tourists." Articles published by El Mundo in 1952 saw the American tourists as selfish people who did not care about the island and ones who will in the future convince the Puerto Rican people to serve them. In the 1950s, Old San Juan was restored by the Puerto Rican government in order to attract American visitors interested in the history of the island.

== Environmental impacts ==
The influx of tourists in the Caribbean has caused environmental damage to both the marine and land ecosystems of the region. The recent increase in cruise ship popularity has led to pollution of coastal waters through the emission of oil, sewage and lubricants. One estimate attributed nearly 80% of all global marine pollution to cruise ships. Additionally, cruise ships anchoring in reef environments can cause damage the corals. In the water around George Town, Cayman Islands, cruise ship anchors were responsible for the damage of 300 acres of reef habitat. Channel dredging in shallow waters to allow for easy passage of large ships disturbs the water and also damage corals and sea grasses. Cruise ships and other watercraft also contribute to the introduction of invasive species by carrying them from one body of water to another. Boat propellers also harm or kill slow moving animals such as sea turtles that live near the water surface.

Heavy foot traffic in beach ecosystems also degrades their natural habitats. Tourists displace rocks, logs and other parts of beach environments that serve as homes for wildlife. Walking on tropical shores can cause serious damage to corals that inhabit the area. Fragile dune environments and the vegetation that inhabit them are damaged due to human foot traffic. The cleaning of natural shore debris to make beaches more appealing for tourists is also an environmental concern. In addition to enhancing the water quality and adding nutrients, this debris provides a home for invertebrates and also a food source for predators of the invertebrates.

Tourist resorts in the Caribbean consume much more water than residential areas do, with many resorts consuming as much as five to ten times more water than residential areas. Hotels that pump untreated sewage into the ocean threaten coral populations that would suffocate in the presence of seaweed growth caused by the sewage. The use of coastal areas to produce hotels has eliminated much of the beach and wetland environments in the region. This not only alters the natural environment but also displaces the plants and animals that live there and threatens ecological balances.

== Visa policies to visit ==
- Antigua & Barbuda
- Argentina
- Bahamas, (Commonwealth of the)
- Barbados
- Belize
- Bolivia
- Brazil
- Chile
- Colombia
- Costa Rica
- Cuba
- Dominica, (Commonwealth of)
- Dominican Republic
- Ecuador
- El Salvador
- Grenada
- Guatemala
- Guyana
- Haiti
- Honduras
- Jamaica
- Mexico
- Nicaragua
- Panama
- Paraguay
- Peru
- Saint Kitts & Nevis
- Saint Lucia
- Saint Vincent & the Grenadines
- Suriname
- Trinidad & Tobago
- Uruguay
- Venezuela

=== Kingdom of the Netherlands ===
- Aruba, Bonaire, Curaçao, Saba, Sint Eustatius, Sint Maarten

=== Republic of France ===
- French Guiana, Guadeloupe, Martinique, Saint Barthélemy, Saint Martin

=== United Kingdom Overseas Territories ===
- Anguilla, Bermuda, British Virgin Islands, Cayman Islands, Montserrat, Turks and Caicos Islands

== See also ==
- Caribbean Tourism Organization
- Economy of the Caribbean
- Aviation in the Caribbean
- List of airports in the Caribbean – (busiest list)
- Infectious disease on cruise ships
- Medical tourism
- List of ports and harbours in the Caribbean
- List of beaches of the Caribbean
- List of hotels in Latin America and the Caribbean
- Culture of the Caribbean
- List of World Heritage Sites in the Caribbean
- Wildlife of the Caribbean

== Bibliography ==
- George Gmelch (21 March 2012). Behind the Smile, Second Edition: The Working Lives of Caribbean Tourism. Bloomington: Indiana University Press. ISBN 978-0-253-00129-0.
- Karen Wilkes (2016). Whiteness, Weddings, and Tourism in the Caribbean: Paradise for Sale. New York : Palgrave Macmillan. ISBN 9781137503909.
- Polly Pattullo (1996). Last Resorts: the Cost of Tourism in the Caribbean. London: Cassell. ISBN 978-0-304-33693-7.
- Angelique Nixon (2015). Resisting Paradise: Tourism, Diaspora, and Sexuality in Caribbean Culture. Mississippi: University Press of Mississippi. ISBN 978-1628462180.
