= Carimar Beach Club =

Hotel in Anguilla

- Location within Anguilla

General information
- Location: Mead's Bay, The Valley, Anguilla
- Coordinates: 18.1850°N 63.1347°W
- Closed: Sept. 2 - Oct. 11, 2019
- Owner: Privately owned

Technical details
- Floor count: 2
- Floor area: 1100 sq. ft.

Design and construction
- Developer: Corwin and Jacobs

Other information
- Number of rooms: 24
- Number of suites: 24
- Parking: Yes

Website
- http://www.carimar.com/

Carimar Beach Club is a boutique condo-style hotel located on Mead's Bay Beach, Anguilla. This beach club is located on an island in the Caribbean with 33 white-sand beaches. Carimar Beach Club currently has 24 villas that are built in the Mediterranean/Spanish style which can be rented as either one or two-bedroom units.

== See also ==
- List of hotels in the Caribbean
