= Peruvian nationality law =

Peruvian Citizenship Act

Congress of the Republic of Peru
- Long title: Ley de Nacionalidad Ley N° 26574
- Territorial extent: Peru
- Enacted by: Government of Peru

Related legislation
- Constitution of Peru
- Status: Current legislation

Peruvian nationality law is regulated by the 1993 Constitution of Peru, the Nationality Law 26574 of 1996, and the Supreme Decree 010-2002-IN, which regulates the implementation of Law 26574. These laws determine who is, or is not eligible to be, a citizen of Peru. The legal means to acquire nationality, formal membership in a nation, differ from the relationship of rights and obligations between a national and the nation, known as citizenship. Peruvian nationality is typically obtained either on the principle of jus soli, i.e. by birth in Peru; or under the rules of jus sanguinis, i.e. by birth abroad to at least one parent with Peruvian nationality. It can also be granted to a permanent resident, who has lived in Peru for a given period of time, through naturalization.

== Acquisition ==
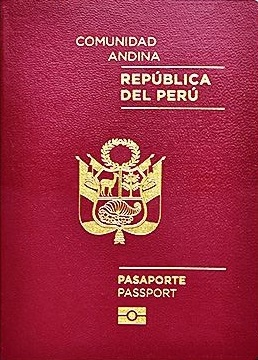
Peruvian passport.

According to the Peruvian Constitution and nationality legislation passed in 1996 as well as an executive order declared in 1997, Peruvian nationality can be passed by birth via jus soli or by registration if born overseas and duly registered at a Peruvian embassy or consulate before the child reaches 18 years of age. As of March 2018, children born abroad to Peruvian parents are now able to register as Peruvian nationals even if they were not registered before age 18 (see next paragraph). In addition, infants or minor children found abandoned on Peruvian territory are assumed to be Peruvian nationals. This is consistent with the nationality law of most countries of the Americas. In 1992, Peru had a scheme of selling nationality to foreign investors for US$25,000. The scheme was closed the year after due to public outrage.

Beginning in March 2018, those children born overseas to Peruvian mothers or fathers who were not registered before reaching 18 years of age can now also acquire Peruvian nationality by applying at their local consular office abroad, under an amendment to Article 52 of the Peruvian Constitution.

Foreigners can also acquire Peruvian nationality, including:

- Minor children born overseas to foreign parents who, having lived in the territory of the republic since five years of age, can elect to acquire Peruvian nationality at 18 years of age by applying to the nearest Peruvian consulate or embassy in their own country
- Foreigners married to Peruvian spouses may acquire Peruvian nationality after two years of marriage and domicile in Peru.

== Dual or multiple nationality ==
In common with many other Ibero-American countries, Peru's 1993 constitution explicitly states that nationals of Latin American countries and Spain do not lose their nationality upon acquiring Peruvian citizenship (many Latin American countries and Spain have similar reciprocal laws). In practice, multiple nationality is acknowledged and accepted by Peru and its consular and diplomatic staff. Peru allows people to have multiple citizenships.

== Naturalization ==
As of 2025, a person who has five years of legal residency in Peru, be it by marriage or other reasons such as work, can apply for naturalization. The five year requirement starts from the date one acquires residency in the country, provided that residency never lapses. The years must be consecutive. If a person has a work visa that expires, and renews it later, it doesn't count as two consecutive years. The renewal must happen before the expiration of the first.

Nationality by option (Marriage): For married people, one needs to marry someone who is a Peruvian citizen, and needs to be married continuously for 4 years and count with immigrant residency before applying for Peruvian nationality.

== History ==
Peru declared independence from Spain in 1821 and adopted its first constitution in 1823. Under Article 10, it defined Peruvians as free men born in the territory, those born anywhere to a Peruvian mother or father, and those who were naturalized according to procedure. The 1826 Constitution granted Peruvian nationality to people who had worked for the nation's independence and the 1828 Constitution allowed foreigners who has served in the national military to become citizens. In 1834 a new constitution made provisions for foreigners married to Peruvian woman or those who practiced a profession or art to become naturalized after two years residency. In 1836, the Peru–Bolivian Confederation was formed and the Bolivian Civil Code of 1830 was adopted in the Peruvian States. Enacted in 1830, it provided that a wife must obey her husband, live where he chose to reside, and regardless of whether the husband's country granted his wife nationality, she lost her own nationality upon marriage. Because of the automatic change of nationality, only illegitimate children could derive nationality from their mother. With the dissolution of the confederation in 1839, Peru adopted a new constitution defining who were Peruvian by birth, which followed the same basic concepts of birth in the territory or birth abroad to Peruvians, and who could be naturalized. These concepts were adopted in the subsequent constitutions of 1856, 1860, 1920, and 1933. The 1933 constitution provided additionally that foundlings of unknown parentage were considered to have been born in Peru and were entitled to Peruvian nationality.

No specific civil code was in force after the Confederation collapsed, but a drafting commission was organized in 1845, which produced the Peruvian Civil Code of 1852. It required married women's nationality to be derived from their husbands. To repatriate, a woman could regain Peruvian nationality upon termination of the marriage by establishing her domicile in the territory. In 1933, Alfredo Solf y Muro, the Peruvian delegate to the Pan-American Union's Montevideo conference, signed the Inter-American Convention on the Nationality of Women, which became effective in 1934, without legal reservations. That year, Peru adopted a new constitution which provided in Article 6 that women acquired the nationality of their husbands, though it stipulated that unless she specifically renounced her Peruvian nationality she could retain it. A foreign woman's nationality was automatically changed upon marriage with a Peruvian husband. In the 1979 Constitution of Peru, the first constitution to specifically reference nationality, Article 93 provided that neither marriage nor its dissolution impacted Peruvian nationality.

== See also ==
- Nationality law
- Multiple citizenship
- Peruvian passport
- Visa requirements for Peruvian citizens
- Visa policy of Peru
