= List of hotels in Latin America and the Caribbean =

This is a list of hotels in the Caribbean.

Geographical note: The Caribbean is a region that consists of the Caribbean Sea, its islands (some surrounded by the Caribbean Sea and some bordering both the Caribbean Sea and the North Atlantic Ocean), and the surrounding coasts. The region is southeast of the Gulf of Mexico and the North American mainland, east of Central America, and north of South America.

== Hotels in the Caribbean ==
=== Anguilla ===
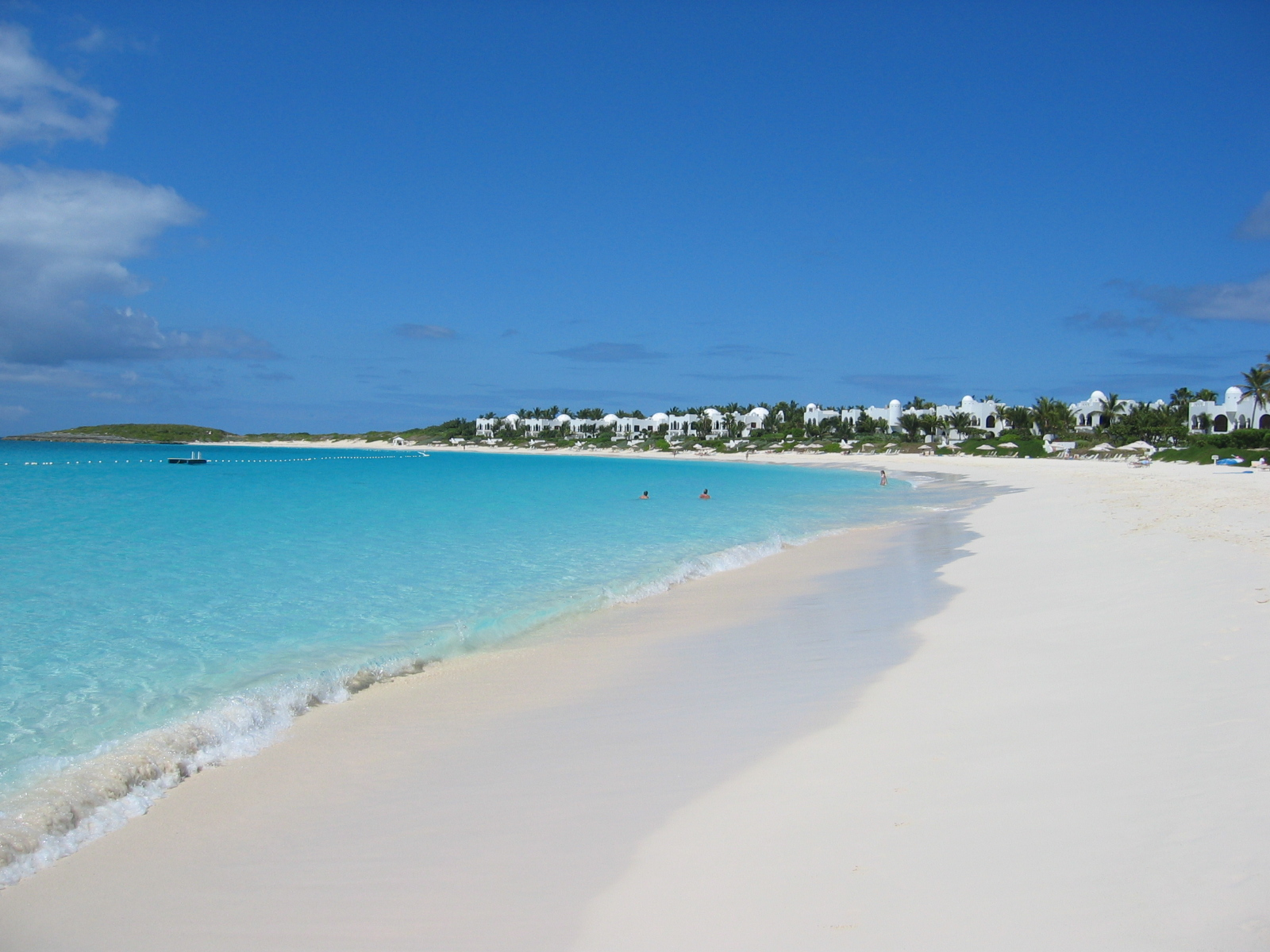
View of the beach at Cap Juluca Hotel

- Cap Juluca Hotel, Cap Juluca
- Carimar Beach Club, Mead's Bay, The Valley
- CuisinArt Resort and Spa, Rendezvous Beach
- Ku Resort, Shoal Bay
- Malliouhana Hotel, Mead's Bay, The Valley
- The Viceroy Anguilla, Mead's Bay, The Valley

=== Aruba ===
- Amsterdam Manor Beach Resort
- Aruba Bucuti Beach Resort
- Aruba Marriott Resort & Stellaris Casino
- Aruba Millenium Resort
- La Quinta Beach Resort
- Occidental Grand Aruba
- Radisson Aruba Resort, Casino & Spa
- Renaissance Aruba Resort and Casino
- Ritz-Carlton Aruba – opened on November 22, 2013
- Tierra el Sol Aruba Resort

=== Barbados ===
- The Fairmont Royal Pavilion in St. James
- The Sandy Lane in St. James

=== Curaçao ===
- Dreams Curaçao Resort
- Plaza Hotel Curaçao

=== Dominica ===
A view of the Garraway Hotel

- Garraway Hotel

=== Saint Lucia ===
- Anse Chastanet resort

=== U.S. Virgin Islands ===
- The Buccaneer (resort), St. Croix

== See also ==
- List of Caribbean-related topics
- Lists of hotels
- Tourism in Latin America and the Caribbean
