= Saint Vincent and the Grenadines passport =

Passport issued to citizens of Saint Vincent and the Grenadines

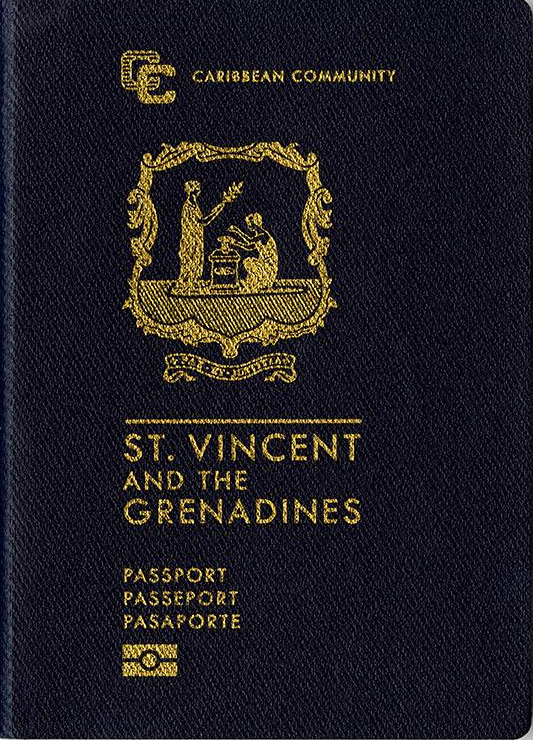
- The front cover of a Saint Vincent and the Grenadines biometric passport
- Type: Passport
- Issued by: Saint Vincent and the Grenadines
- Purpose: Identification
- Eligibility: Saint Vincent and the Grenadines citizenship

Saint Vincent and the Grenadines passports are issued to citizens of Saint Vincent and the Grenadines to travel outside the country. Since April 2005, the new issued passports comply with the CARICOM common passports. At present, they issue Machine readable passports which have a black exterior with gold writing.

As of 1 January 2017, Saint Vincent and the Grenadines citizens had visa-free or visa on arrival access to 127 countries and territories, ranking the Saint Vincent and the Grenadines passport 36th in terms of travel freedom (tied with Macao, Panamanian and Saint Lucian passports) according to the Henley visa restrictions index.

== See also ==
- Visa requirements for Saint Vincent and the Grenadines citizens
- Caribbean passport
- Visa policy of Saint Vincent and the Grenadines
