= Visa requirements for Peruvian citizens =

Administrative entry restrictions

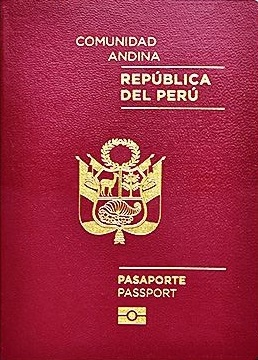
The new e-passport issued to Peruvian citizens.

Visa requirements for Peruvian citizens are administrative entry restrictions by the authorities of other states placed on citizens of Peru.

As of 2026, Peruvian citizens had visa-free or visa on arrival access to 141 countries and territories, ranking the Peruvian passport 29th in the world according to the Henley Passport Index.

The Schengen Area introduced visa-free access for Peruvian citizens for 90 days on 15 March 2016.

The United Kingdom introduced visa-free access for Peruvian citizens for stays less than six months starting on 9 November 2022.

South American countries do not even require a passport as a document to allow Peruvian citizens to visit their countries as tourist; a national or state-issued ID card is enough. Nevertheless, this piece of identification must be in a good conservation state and less than ten years from its issue date, according to agreements signed in Mercosur's treaties.

== Visa requirements map ==
Visa requirements for Peruvian citizens holding ordinary passports Republic of Peru Freedom of movement / ID card valid Visa not required Visa on arrival eVisa Visa available both on arrival or online Visa required

== Visa requirements ==
Visa requirements for holders of normal passports traveling for tourist purposes:

Peru is an associated member of Mercosur. As such, its citizens enjoy unlimited access to any of the full members (Argentina, Brazil, Paraguay and Uruguay) and other associated members (Bolivia, Colombia and Ecuador) with the right to residence and work, with no requirement other than nationality. Citizens of these nine countries (including Peru) may apply for the grant of "temporary residence" for up to 2 years in another country of the bloc. Then, they may apply for "permanent residence" just before the term of their "temporary residence" expires.
Implementation has varied: Chile limits the benefit to nationals of initial signatories, excluding Peru, Colombia, and Ecuador. Venezuela never ratified the accord, and Argentina and Uruguay grant residence to all South Americans regardless of reciprocity.

Country	Visa requirement	Allowed stay	Notes
Afghanistan	eVisa	30 days	Visa is not required in case born in Afghanistan or can proof that one of their parents is a national of Afghanistan or born in Afghanistan.; e-Visa : Visitors must arrive at Kabul International (KBL).
Albania	Visa not required	90 days	
Algeria	Visa required		Persons may be denied entry if entering with a passport containing visas or stamps issued by Israel.; Visitors on tours organized to some southern regions by an approved travel agency may obtain a visa on arrival for up to 30 days.
Andorra	Visa not required		
Angola	eVisa	30 days	30 days per trip, but no more than 90 days within any 1 calendar year for tourism purposes only.; Visitors must have a return/onward ticket and a hotel reservation confirmation.; An International Certificate of Vaccination is required.
Antigua and Barbuda	Visa not required	6 months	
Argentina	Visa not required	90 days	Entry is allowed with a valid Peruvian identity card that is less than 10 years old.; Peruvians can live and work legally in Argentina under the Mercosur (and Associated Members) immigration agreement with no requirement other than being a citizen at birth or a naturalized citizen for over 5 years, and passing a background check.
Armenia	eVisa / Visa on arrival	120 days	
Australia	Visa required		Apply online (Online Visitor e600 visa).
Austria	Visa not required	90 days	90 days within any 180 day period in the Schengen Area.
Azerbaijan	eVisa	30 days	
Bahamas	Visa not required	3 months	
Bahrain	eVisa / Visa on arrival	14 days	Visa fee : 25 BHD; Extension of stay possible for additional 2 weeks.
Bangladesh	Visa on arrival	30 days	Extension possible.
Barbados	Visa not required	28 days	
Belarus	Visa not required	30 days	Must arrive and depart via Minsk International Airport.
Belgium	Visa not required	90 days	90 days within any 180 day period in the Schengen Area
Belize	Visa not required	30 days	
Benin	eVisa	30 days	Must have an international vaccination certificate.; Three types of electronic visa are offered: the e-Visa valid for 30 days for a single entry (50 EUR), the e-Visa valid for 30 days for several (multiple) entries (75 EUR), and the e-Visa valid for 90 days to make several (multiple) entries (100 EUR).
Bhutan	eVisa	90 days	The Sustainable Development Fee (SDF) of 200 USD per person, per night for almost all visitors to Bhutan. Additionally, if payment is made in US dollars from September 1, 2023 to August 31, 2027, the SDF is 100 USD.
Bolivia	Visa not required	90 days	Entry is allowed with a valid Peruvian identity card that is less than 10 years old.; Peruvians can live and work legally in Bolivia under the Mercosur (and Associated Members) immigration agreement with no requirement other than being a citizen at birth or a naturalized citizen for over 5 years, and passing a background check.
Bosnia and Herzegovina	Visa not required	90 days	
Botswana	Visa not required	90 days	
Brazil	Visa not required	90 days	Entry is allowed with a valid Peruvian identity card that is less than 10 years old.; Peruvians can live and work legally in Brazil under the Mercosur (and Associated Members) immigration agreement with no requirement other than being a citizen at birth or a naturalized citizen for over 5 years, and passing a background check.
Brunei	Visa not required	14 days	
Bulgaria	Visa not required	90 days	90 days within any 180 day period in the Schengen Area.
Burkina Faso	eVisa	1 month	Visa on arrival for 1 month for holders of a valid visa issued by a Schengen Member State. Single entry fee : XOF 47,000; Multiple entry fee : XOF 61,000;
Burundi	Online Visa / Visa on arrival	1 month	
Cambodia	eVisa / Visa on arrival	30 days	Visa fee : 30 USD - for tourists; 35 USD - when traveling on business. Obtainable on arrival at Airport or main points of Border Crossing.
Cameroon	eVisa		
Canada	Visa required		
Cape Verde	Visa required		
Central African Republic	Visa required		
Chad	eVisa		
Chile	Visa not required	90 days	Valid passport required.
China	Visa not required	30 days	Visa-free from 1 June 2025 until 31 December 2026.; 24-hour visa-free transit through any international airports of China, allows domestic travel through different airports. (Note: Custom procedure for 24-hour visa-free transit is required in principle, except in Beijing (both Capital and Daxing), Shanghai Pudong, Hangzhou, Xiamen, Guangzhou, Shenzhen, Chengdu Tianfu and Xi'an if no leaving of international transit areas.); Visa on arrival available for Shenzhen and Xiamen (5 days stay maximum) and Zhuhai (3 days stay maximum) for CNY 275
Colombia	Visa not required	90 days	Entry is allowed with a valid Peruvian identity card that is less than 10 years old.; Peruvians can live and work legally in Colombia under the Mercosur (and Associated Members) immigration agreement with no requirement other than being a citizen at birth or a naturalized citizen for over 5 years, and passing a background check.
Comoros	Visa on arrival	45 days	Visa fee : 30 EUR, or 50 USD.
Republic of the Congo	Visa required		
Democratic Republic of the Congo	eVisa	7 days	
Costa Rica	Visa not required	90 days	
Côte d'Ivoire	eVisa	3 months	e-Visa holders must arrive via Port Bouet Airport.
Croatia	Visa not required	90 days	90 days within any 180 day period in the Schengen Area.
Cuba	eVisa	90 days	
Cyprus	Visa not required	90 days	90 days within any 180 day period.
Czech Republic	Visa not required	90 days	90 days within any 180 day period in the Schengen Area.
Denmark	Visa not required	90 days	90 days within any 180 day period in the Schengen Area.
Djibouti	eVisa	90 days	
Dominica	Visa not required	21 days	
Dominican Republic	Visa not required	30 days	Can be extended up to 120 days with fee.
Ecuador	Visa not required	180 days	Entry is allowed with a valid Peruvian identity card that is less than 10 years old.; Peruvians can live and work legally in Ecuador under the Mercosur (and Associated Members) immigration agreement with no requirement other than being a citizen at birth or a naturalized citizen for over 5 years, and passing a background check.
Egypt	eVisa / Visa on arrival	30 days	Visa fee : 30 USD
El Salvador	Visa not required	90 days	
Equatorial Guinea	eVisa		Must arrive via Malabo International Airport, processing fee is 75 USD.
Eritrea	Visa required		
Estonia	Visa not required	90 days	90 days within any 180 day period in the Schengen Area.
Eswatini	Visa required		
Ethiopia	eVisa	90 days	e-Visa holders must arrive via Addis Ababa Bole International Airport
Fiji	Visa not required	4 months	
Finland	Visa not required	90 days	90 days within any 180 day period in the Schengen Area.
France and territories	Visa not required	90 days	90 days within any 180 day period in the Schengen Area.
Gabon	eVisa	90 days	e-Visa holders must arrive at Libreville International Airport.
Gambia	Visa required		An entry clearance must be obtained from the Gambian Immigration prior to travel.
Georgia	Visa not required	90 days	90 days within any 180 day period.
Germany	Visa not required	90 days	90 days within any 180 day period in the Schengen Area.
Ghana	Visa required		
Greece	Visa not required	90 days	90 days within any 180 day period in the Schengen Area.
Grenada	Visa not required	3 months	Beginning on 1 December 2020, all travellers to Grenada will be required to complete an online application in order to receive a Pure Safe Travel Authorization Certificate to enter Grenada.
Guatemala	Visa not required	90 days	
Guinea	eVisa	90 days	
Guinea-Bissau	Visa on arrival	90 days	
Guyana	Visa not required	90 days	
Haiti	Visa not required	3 months	
Honduras	Visa not required	30 days	
Hungary	Visa not required	90 days	90 days within any 180 day period in the Schengen Area.
Iceland	Visa not required	90 days	90 days within any 180 day period in the Schengen Area.
India	eVisa	30 days	e-Visa holders must arrive via 32 designated airports (Note: Ahmedabad; Amritsar; Bagdogra; Bengaluru; Bhubaneswar; Chandigarh; Chennai; Coimbatore; Delhi; Gaya; Goa-Dabolim; Goa-Manohar; Guwahati; Hyderabad; Indore; Jaipur; Kannur; Kochi; Kolkata; Kozhikode; Lucknow; Madurai; Mangaluru; Mumbai; Nagpur; Port Blair; Pune; Surat; Thiruvananthapuram; Tiruchirappalli; Varanasi; Visakhapatnam) or 5 designated seaports. (Note: Chennai; Cochin; Mormugao (Goa); Mumbai; Mangalore); An Indian e-Tourist Visa may only be obtained twice within 1 calendar year.; Foreigners of Pakistani origin or who hold a Pakistani Passport are not eligible for an e-Visa. Foreigners who are not Pakistani nationals, but whose parents or grandparents (either paternal or maternal) were born in, or were permanent residents in Pakistan, are also not eligible for an e-Visa.
Indonesia	e-VOA / Visa on arrival	30 days	
Iran	Visa not required	15 days	
Iraq	eVisa	30 days	
Ireland	Visa required		
Israel	Electronic Travel Authorization	90 days	
Italy	Visa not required	90 days	90 days within any 180 day period in the Schengen Area.
Jamaica	Visa not required	30 days	
Japan	Visa not required	90 days	Peruvian citizens will not require a visa for short-term stays in Japan for tourism purposes, with a maximum stay of 90 days. Starting on 1 July 2025
Jordan	eVisa / Visa on arrival	30 days	Visa can be obtained upon arrival, it will cost a total of 40 JOD, obtainable at most international ports of entry and land border crossings. (except King Hussein/Allenby Bridge)
Kazakhstan	Visa required		Kazakhstan e-Visa; E-Visa can be issued only if there is a valid invitation from the Kazakh side.; To apply for an e-Visa, you need an invitation number received from the inviting Kazakh side.; The issued electronic visa must be printed out for presentation at the state border crossing and on the territory of the Republic of Kazakhstan.; E-Visa gives the right to enter / exit the Republic of Kazakhstan only through the international airports of Astana and Almaty.; E-Visas are not issued to foreigners with whom children travel together.
Kenya	Electronic Travel Authorisation	90 days	Applications can be submitted up to 90 days prior to travel and must be submitted at least 3 days in advance.; eTA fee is 32.50 USD.; Proof of reservation at the hotel where visitors plan to stay is required (if staying with friends, an invitation letter is also acceptable).; Yellow fever vaccination certificate is required if coming from endemic countries.
Kiribati	Visa not required	90 days	90 days within any 12-month period.
North Korea	Visa required		
South Korea	Electronic Travel Authorization	90 days	The validity period of a K-ETA is 3 years from the date of approval.
Kuwait	Visa required		e-Visa can be obtained for holders of a Residence Permit issued by a GCC member state under the following conditions: To be 18 years old and over.; The residence permit for a GCC state must be valid for at least another 3 months.; To be accompanied by the sponsor of the residence permit if the sponsor is an individual.; Does not apply to holders of a GCC Student Visa and Non-Skilled Worker Visa
Kyrgyzstan	eVisa	60 days	e-Visa holders must arrive via Manas International Airport or Osh Airport or through land crossings with China (at Irkeshtam and Torugart), Kazakhstan (at Ak-jol, Ak-Tilek, Chaldybar, Chon-Kapka), Tajikistan (at Bor-Dobo, Kulundu, Kyzyl-Bel) and Uzbekistan (at Dostuk).
Laos	eVisa / Visa on arrival	30 days	18 (Note: Savannakhet Airport; Lanetoui - Mengkang (China); Meuangmom - Wan Pong (Myanmar); Banvang - Ban Khok Phai (Thailand); Namngeun - Huay Kon (Thailand); Paksan - Bueng Kan (Thailand); Paktaphan - Pak Saeng (Thailand); Pangmon - Ban Huak (Thailand); Phoudou (Thailand); Dak ta ock - Nam Giang (Vietnam); La Lai (Vietnam); Namkan (Vietnam); Namphao - Cau Treo (Vietnam); Namsoy - Na Meo (Vietnam); Naphao - Cha Lo (Vietnam); Pahang - Long Sap (Vietnam); Panghok - Tây Trang (Vietnam); Phoukeua - Bo Y (Vietnam)) of the 33 border crossings are only open to regular visa holders.; e-Visa may be used to enter Laos through the Luang Prabang, Pakse and Vientiane international airports, 3 Thai-Lao Friendship Bridges (Note: Vientiane (Friendship Bridge 1); Savannakhet (Friendship Bridge 2); Bokeo (Friendship Bridge 4)), in Boten (road and railroad), and in Vientiane (at Khamsavath railway station).; Visa on arrival is available at the Luang Prabang, Pakse and Vientiane international airports, 4 Thai-Lao Friendship Bridges (Note: Vientiane (Friendship Bridge 1); Savannakhet (Friendship Bridge 2); Khammouane (Friendship Bridge 3); Bokeo (Friendship Bridge 4)) and 7 border crossings. (Note: Nongnokkheane - Trapeang Kriel (Cambodia); Boten - Bo han (China); Golden Triangle/Samliemkham (Thailand); Khamsavath railway station (Thailand); Namheuang - Ban Na Kraseng (Thailand); Vang tao - Chongmek (Thailand); Dansavan - Lao Bảo (Vietnam))
Latvia	Visa not required	90 days	90 days within any 180 day period in the Schengen Area.
Lebanon	Free Visa on arrival	1 month	1 month extendable for 2 additional months.; Free of charge at Beirut International Airport, if there is no Israeli visa or stamp, holding a telephone number and address in Lebanon.
Lesotho	Visa required		
Liberia	e-VOA	3 months	
Libya	eVisa	30 days	
Liechtenstein	Visa not required	90 days	90 days within any 180 day period in the Schengen Area.
Lithuania	Visa not required	90 days	90 days within any 180 day period in the Schengen Area.
Luxembourg	Visa not required	90 days	90 days within any 180 day period in the Schengen Area.
Madagascar	eVisa / Visa on arrival	90 days	For stays of 61 to 90 days, the visa fee is 59 USD.
Malawi	eVisa / Visa on arrival	30 days	
Malaysia	Visa not required	90 days	
Maldives	Free visa on arrival	30 days	Extensions of stay possible up to a max. of 90 days, for a fee : 750 MVR
Mali	Visa required		
Malta	Visa not required	90 days	90 days within any 180 day period in the Schengen Area.
Marshall Islands	Visa on arrival	90 days	
Mauritania	eVisa	30 days	
Mauritius	Visa on arrival	60 days	
Mexico	Visa required		Peruvian citizens holding Schengen, United Kingdom, Canada, United States, Australia and Japan visas, as well as those with permanent residence in the countries concerned and in the members of the Pacific Alliance are exempt from visa.
Micronesia	Visa not required	30 days	
Moldova	Visa not required	90 days	90 days within any 180 day period.
Monaco	Visa not required		
Mongolia	Visa not required	90 days	
Montenegro	Visa not required	30 days	
Morocco	Visa not required	3 months	
Mozambique	eVisa / Visa on arrival	30 days	
Myanmar	eVisa	28 days	e-Visa holders must arrive via Yangon, Nay Pyi Taw or Mandalay airports or via land border crossings with Thailand — Tachileik, Myawaddy and Kawthaung or India — Rih Khaw Dar and Tamu.; e-Visa is available for tourism only.
Namibia	eVisa / Visa on arrival	3 months / 90 days	Available at Hosea Kutako International Airport, Kalahari Border Crossing and Walvis Bay Airport.
Nauru	Visa required		
Nepal	eVisa / Visa on arrival	90 days	Visa fee : Between 25 USD and 100 USD - or equivalent in convertible currency.
Netherlands	Visa not required	90 days	90 days within any 180 day period in the Schengen Area.
New Zealand	Visa required		May transit without visa if transit is through Auckland Airport and for no longer than 24 hours, subject to meeting character requirements and obtaining an Electronic Travel Authority prior to departure.; Holders of an Australian Permanent Resident Visa or Resident Return Visa may be granted a New Zealand Resident Visa on arrival permitting indefinite stay (pursuant to the Trans-Tasman Travel Arrangement), subject to meeting character requirements and obtaining an Electronic Travel Authority prior to departure.
Nicaragua	Visa required		
Niger	Visa required		
Nigeria	eVisa	30 days	
North Macedonia	Visa not required	90 days	
Norway	Visa not required	90 days	90 days within any 180 day period in the Schengen Area.
Oman	Visa required		To obtain Visa-free or e-Visa, they are required to be either residents or have a valid entry visa for one of the following countries (the United States of America, Canada, Australia, The United Kingdom, Schengen Agreement countries, Japan), or to be residents of one of the countries of The GCC countries and its profession are among the professions that benefit from the resident visa.; Passengers must ensure they hold a pre-booked hotel booking, health insurance, and a return ticket.
Pakistan	eVisa	3 months	
Palau	Free visa on arrival	30 days	Free of charge.; Extension possible for a fee : 50 USD
Panama	Visa not required	90 days	
Papua New Guinea	eVisa	60 days	Available at Gurney Airport (Alotau), Mount Hagen Airport, Port Moresby Airport and Tokua Airport (Rabaul).
Paraguay	Visa not required	90 days	Entry is allowed with a valid Peruvian identity card that is less than 10 years old.; Peruvians can live and work legally in Paraguay under the Mercosur (and Associated Members) immigration agreement with no requirement other than being a citizen at birth or a naturalized citizen for over 5 years, and passing a background check.
Philippines	Visa not required	30 days	
Poland	Visa not required	90 days	90 days within any 180 day period in the Schengen Area.
Portugal	Visa not required	90 days	90 days within any 180 day period in the Schengen Area.
Qatar	Visa not required	30 days	
Romania	Visa not required	90 days	90 days within any 180 day period in the Schengen Area.
Russia	Visa not required	90 days	90 days within any 180 day period.
Rwanda	eVisa / Visa on arrival	30 days	
Saint Kitts and Nevis	Electronic Travel Authorisation	3 months	
Saint Lucia	Visa on arrival	6 weeks	Visa fee : 50 USD
Saint Vincent and the Grenadines	Visa not required	3 months	Extension of stay possible.
Samoa	Entry permit on arrival	90 days	
San Marino	Visa not required		
São Tomé and Príncipe	eVisa		
Saudi Arabia	Visa required		Residents of GCC countries can apply for Saudi e-Visas online and residents of the United States, United Kingdom and European Union may apply for a visa on arrival
Senegal	Visa required		
Serbia	Visa not required	90 days	
Seychelles	Electronic Border System	3 months	Application can be submitted up to 30 days before travel.; Visitors must upload a reservation confirmation(s) for each visitor's location of stay in Seychelles.; Yellow fever vaccination certificate is required if coming from endemic countries.; Payment of the fee (EUR 10) by credit or debit card.; Valid for one journey only and it expires once exit the country.
Sierra Leone	eVisa	3 months	
Singapore	Visa not required	30 days	
Slovakia	Visa not required	90 days	90 days within any 180 day period in the Schengen Area.
Slovenia	Visa not required	90 days	90 days within any 180 day period in the Schengen Area.
Solomon Islands	Visa required		
Somalia	eVisa	30 days	
South Africa	Visa not required	30 days	
South Sudan	eVisa		Obtainable online 30 days single entry for 100 USD, 90 days multiple entry for 200 USD and 180 days multiple entry for 350 USD.; Printed visa authorization must be presented at the time of travel.
Spain	Visa not required	90 days	90 days within any 180 day period in the Schengen Area.
Sri Lanka	ETA / Visa on arrival	30 days	
Sudan	Visa required		
Suriname	Visa not required	90 days	An entrance fee of USD 50 or EUR 50 must be paid online prior to arrival.; Multiple entry e-Visa is also available.
Sweden	Visa not required	90 days	90 days within any 180 day period in the Schengen Area.
Switzerland	Visa not required	90 days	90 days within any 180 day period in the Schengen Area.
Syria	eVisa		
Tajikistan	eVisa	60 days	
Tanzania	eVisa / Visa on arrival	90 days	
Thailand	Visa not required	90 days	90 days within any 180 day period.; Extension possible.
Timor-Leste	Visa on arrival	30 days	Visa fee : 30 USD - (payable in USD only).
Togo	eVisa	15 days	
Tonga	Visa required		
Trinidad and Tobago	Visa not required	90 days	
Tunisia	Visa required		
Turkey	Visa not required	90 days	90 days within any 180 day period.
Turkmenistan	Visa required		10-day visa on arrival if holding a letter of invitation provided by a company registered in Turkmenistan with a prior approval from the Foreign Ministry. Visitors can apply to extend their stay for an additional 10 days.; When transiting between two non-bordering countries, visitors can obtain a Turkmenistan transit visa for a five-day stay. This must be applied for in advance at the Turkmenistan Embassy. Visitors must also submit copies of the visas for the country of entry into Turkmenistan and the country of departure from Turkmenistan. Visa fee is 20 USD.
Tuvalu	Visa on arrival	1 month	
Uganda	eVisa	3 months	Visa fee : 100 USD
Ukraine	Visa not required	90 days	
United Arab Emirates	Visa not required	90 days	
United Kingdom	Electronic Travel Authorisation	6 months	
United States	Visa required		
Uruguay	Visa not required	3 months	Entry is allowed with a valid Peruvian identity card that is less than 10 years old.; Peruvians can live and work legally in Uruguay under the Mercosur (and Associated Members) immigration agreement with no requirement other than being a citizen at birth or a naturalized citizen for over 5 years, and passing a background check.
Uzbekistan	eVisa	30 days	5-day visa-free transit at the international airports if holding a confirmed onward ticket for a flight to a third country.
Vanuatu	Visa not required	120 days	
Vatican City	Visa not required		
Venezuela	eVisa		Introduction of Electronic Visa System for Tourist and Business Travelers.
Vietnam	eVisa		30 days visa-free when visit Phu Quoc Island.
Yemen	Visa required		Yemen introduced an e-Visa system for visitors who meet certain eligibility requirements (group travel of 10 or more people, business trips, and transit etc.).
Zambia	eVisa / Visa on arrival	90 days	90 days within 1 year.; Visa fee : 50 USD (single entry) and 80 USD (multiple entry).
Zimbabwe	eVisa /Visa on arrival	1 month	1 month for visits on business, 3 months for tourists.

== Unrecognized or partially recognized countries ==
Countries	Conditions of access	Notes
Abkhazia	Visa required	Tourists from all countries (except Georgia) can visit Abkhazia for a period not exceeding 24 hours as part of an organized tourist group.
Kosovo	Visa required	Visa not required for holders of a valid biometric residence permit issued by one of the Schengen member states or a valid multi-entry Schengen Visa, a holder of a valid Laissez-Passer issued by United Nations Organizations, NATO, OSCE, Council of Europe or European Union a holder of a valid travel documents issued by EU Member and Schengen States, United States of America, Canada, Australia and Japan based on the 1951 Convention on Refugee Status or the 1954 Convention on the Status of Stateless Persons, as well as holders of valid travel documents for foreigners (max. 15 days stay)
Northern Cyprus	Visa not required	
Palestine	Visa not required	
Sahrawi Arab Democratic Republic	Visa regime undefined	Undefined visa regime in the Western Sahara controlled territory.
South Ossetia	Visa required	To enter South Ossetia, visitors must have a multiple-entry visa for Russia and register their stay with the Migration Service of the Ministry of Internal Affairs within 3 days.
Taiwan	eVisa	
Transnistria	Visa not required	Visitors must complete and obtain a temporary migration card at the border checkpoint. The maximum period of stay is 45 days, and it can be extended multiple times through this card.

== Dependent and autonomous territories ==
Countries	Conditions of access	Notes
China
Hong Kong	Visa not required	30 days
Macao	Visa on arrival	Visa on Arrival for 100 MOP or HKD and allowed to stay 30 days.
Denmark
Faroe Islands	Visa not required	90 days
Greenland	Visa not required	90 days
France
French Guiana	Visa not required	90 days within 180 days.
French Polynesia	Visa not required	90 days
French West Indies	Visa not required	90 days; French West Indies refers to Martinique, Guadeloupe, Saint Martin and Saint Barthélemy.
Mayotte	Visa not required	90 days
New Caledonia	Visa not required	3 months within any 6-month period.
Réunion	Visa not required	90 days
Saint Pierre and Miquelon	Visa not required	90 days
Wallis and Futuna	Visa not required	90 days
New Zealand
Cook Islands	Visa not required	31 days
Niue	Visa not required	30 days
Tokelau	Visa required	
Netherlands
Aruba	Visa not required	90 days within 180 days.
Caribbean Netherlands	Visa not required	Includes Bonaire, Sint Eustatius and Saba. 90 days within 180 days.
Curaçao	Visa not required	90 days within 180 days.
Sint Maarten	Visa not required	90 days within 180 days.
United Kingdom
Anguilla	eVisa	Except for passengers with a visa issued by Canada, USA or the United Kingdom for a maximum stay of 3 months.
Bermuda	Visa not required	Bermuda Immigration officers will decide on max. period of stay (up to 6 months).
British Virgin Islands	Visa required	Visa not required for passengers with a visa issued by Canada, USA or United Kingdom valid for a minimum of 6 months on arrival. They must travel as tourists or on business for a maximum stay of 6 months.
Cayman Islands	Visa required	Visa requirement effective on 2 April 2026.; Visa not required for travelers holding a valid Canadian, UK or US residence permit and provided that they present upon arrival a return or round-trip ticket to the country that issued the residence permit. Holders of a Canadian residence permit may alternatively present a return or round-trip ticket to the United States.
Falkland Islands	Visa required	Except for passengers with a written authority issued by HM Government of the UK, the Falkland Islands Government, or a British Consulate.
Gibraltar	Visa not required	90 days within any 180 day period in the Schengen Area
Guernsey	Visa not required	6 months
Isle of Man	Visa not required	6 months
Montserrat	eVisa	Except for passengers with a visa issued by an EU Member State, Canada, or the USA.
Saint Helena	eVisa	
Jersey	Visa not required	6 months
United States
American Samoa	Visa required	
Guam	Visa required	
Northern Mariana Islands	Visa required	Except for passengers with a US entry visa which is valid for at least 6 months from entry into the Northern Mariana Islands and allows re-entry into the USA.
U.S. Virgin Islands	Visa required	Except for those admitted to the USA on a visa, returning to the US after a visit of max. 30 days to Canada or Mexico or to adjacent islands (except for Cuba).
Puerto Rico	Visa required	Except for those admitted to the USA on a visa, returning to the US after a visit of max. 30 days to Canada or Mexico or to adjacent islands (except for Cuba).

== APEC Business Travel Card ==
Full members of the scheme Transitional members (United States, Canada)

Holders of an APEC Business Travel Card (ABTC) travelling on business do not require a visa to the following countries:

- Australia^{2}
- Brunei^{2}
- Chile^{2}
- China^{4}
- Hong Kong^{4}
- Indonesia^{4}
- Japan^{2}
- Malaysia^{2}
- Mexico^{1}
- New Zealand^{2}
- Papua New Guinea^{4}
- Philippines^{4}
- Russia^{3}
- Singapore^{4}
- South Korea^{2}
- Taiwan^{2}
- Thailand^{2}
- Vietnam^{4}

_{1 - Up to 180 days}
_{2 - Up to 90 days}
_{3 - Up to 90 days in a period of 180 days}
_{4 - Up to 60 days}

The card must be used in conjunction with a passport and has the following advantages:

- No need to apply for a visa or entry permit to APEC countries, as the card is treated as such (except by Canada and United States)
- Undertake legitimate business in participating economies
- Expedited border crossing in all member economies, including transitional members

== See also ==
- Visa policy of Peru
- Peruvian passport
