= Fairmont Royal Pavilion =

Hotel in Barbados

The Fairmont Royal Pavilion
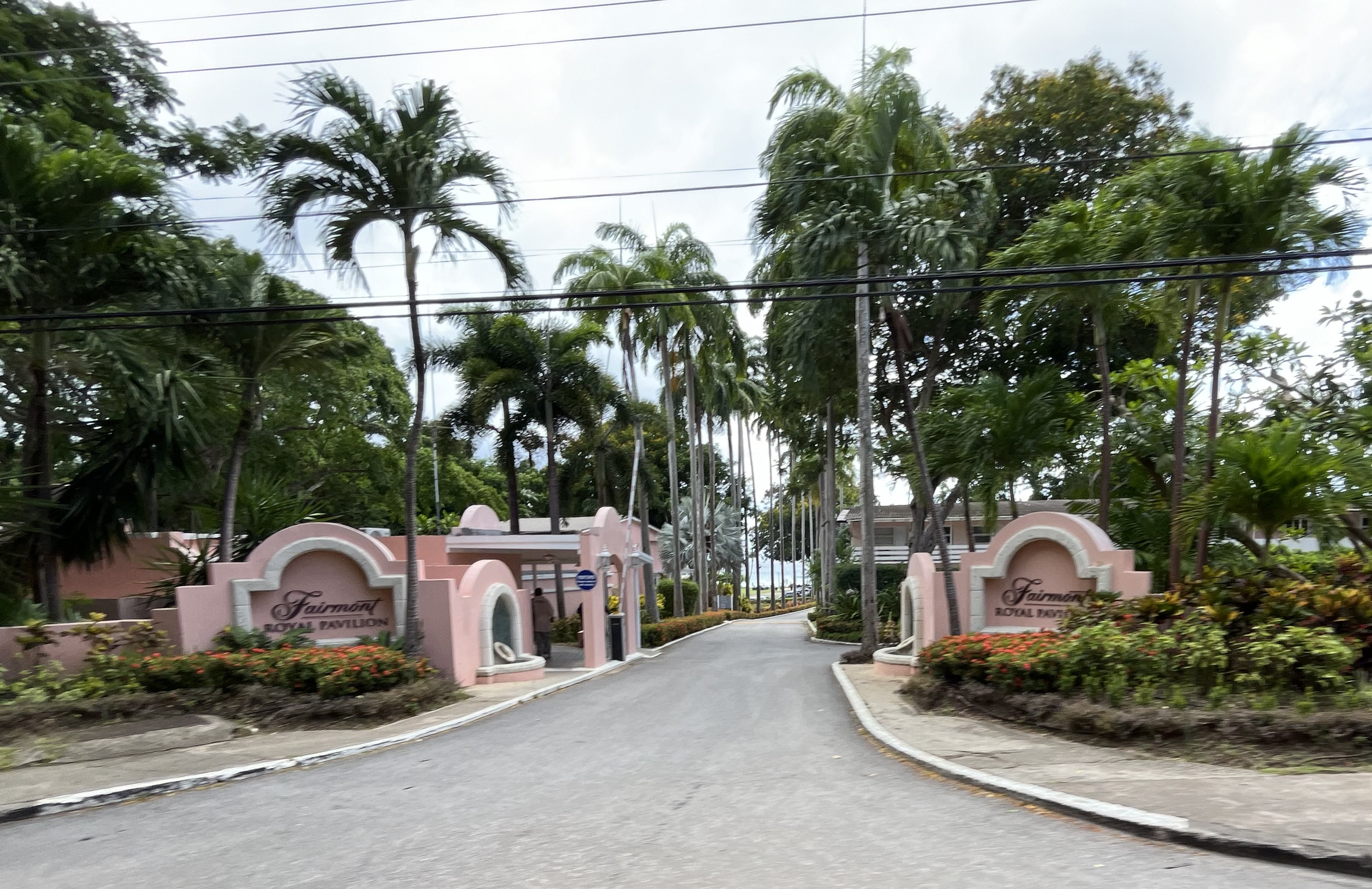

- Location within Barbados

General information
- Location: St. James, Barbados
- Coordinates: 13.2028°N 59.6404°W
- Opening: 1987
- Management: Fairmont Hotels and Resorts

Other information
- Number of rooms: 75

Website
- www.fairmont.com/royalpavilion

The Fairmont Royal Pavilion is a beachfront hotel in St. James, Barbados is situated 29 km (17 miles) from the Grantley Adams International Airport and 14 km (8 miles) from the capital city of Bridgetown, and a half mile from the nearest shopping centre in Holetown.

== History and architecture ==
The Fairmont Royal Pavilion was originally The Miramar Hotel, built in the 1940s and the first hotel to be constructed on the West Coast of Barbados. The original structure had only 12 rooms and now houses the Palm Terrace Restaurant. The Taboras Restaurant was once the manager's bungalow and the private three-bedroom villa part of what was known as the Garden Rooms.

In later years came an expansion into a hotel and private residence estate. The Miramar was purchased by a private investor in April 1987, who immediately began work on restoration. Doors opened in December 1987.

Today, The Fairmont Royal Pavilion is situated on an 11-acre (45,000 m^{2}) estate with gardens.

== See also ==
- List of hotels in the Caribbean
