= Visa requirements for Saint Vincent and the Grenadines citizens =

Entry restriction for Saint Vincent and the Grenadines citizens

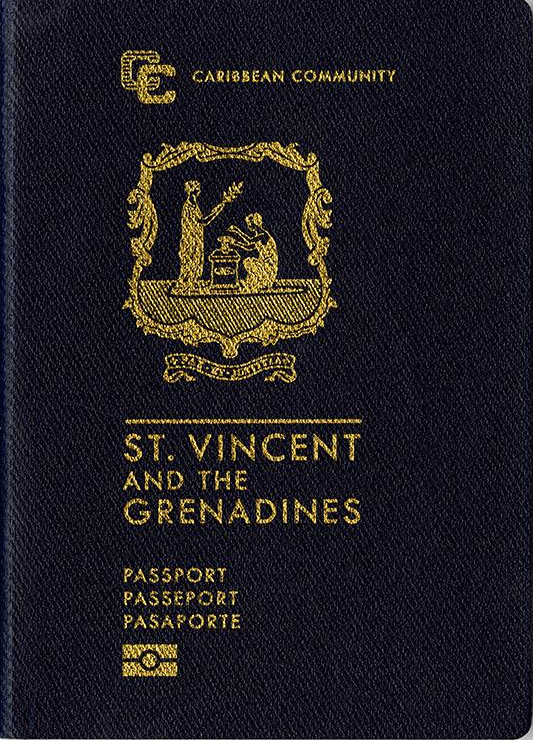
A Saint Vincent and the Grenadines passport

Visa requirements for Saint Vincent and the Grenadines citizens are administrative entry restrictions by the authorities of other states placed on citizens of Saint Vincent and the Grenadines. As of 2026, Saint Vincent and the Grenadines citizens have visa-free or visa on arrival access to 157 countries and territories, ranking the Saint Vincent and the Grenadines passport 19th in terms of travel freedom according to the Henley Passport Index.

Saint Vincent and the Grenadines signed a mutual visa waiver agreement with Schengen Area countries on 28 May 2015.

== Visa requirements map ==
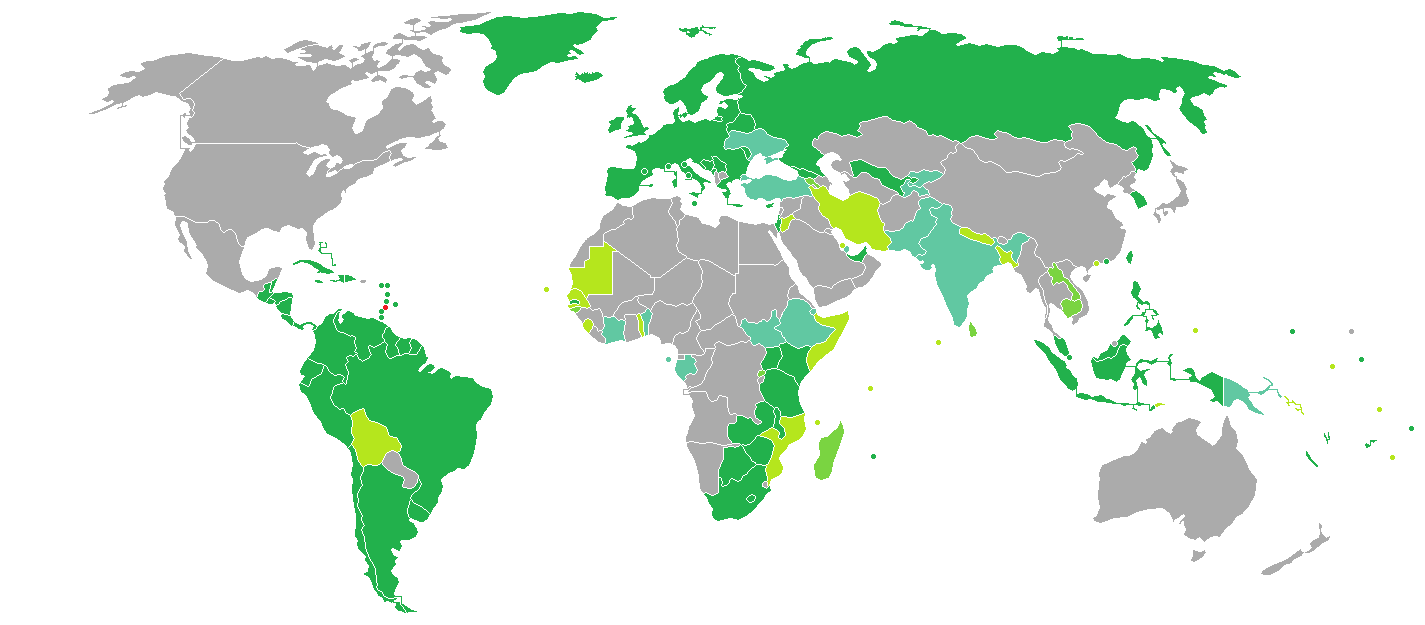
Visa requirements for Saint Vincent and the Grenadines citizens Saint Vincent and the Grenadines Visa free access Visa on arrival eVisa Visa available both on arrival or online Visa required

== Visa requirements ==
Country	Visa requirement	Allowed stay	Notes (excluding departure fees)
Afghanistan	eVisa	30 days	Visa is not required in case born in Afghanistan or can proof that one of their parents is a national of Afghanistan or born in Afghanistan.; e-Visa : Visitors must arrive at Kabul International (KBL).
Albania	eVisa		Visa is not required for Holders of a valid multiple-entry Schengen, UK or US visa has been previously used once or residence permit of Ireland, Schengen, UK, US or UAE 10 years.
Algeria	Visa required		Visa Issuance for passengers with a boarding authorization traveling as tourists to cities in the south of Algeria (Timimoun, Ghardaia, Ilizi, Djanet or Tamanraset) can obtain a visa on arrival for a maximum of 30 days. They must have: a return/onward ticket, a hotel reservation confirmation.
Andorra	Visa not required		
Angola	Visa not required	30 days	
Antigua and Barbuda	Visa not required	Freedom of movement for OECS states; ID card valid	
Argentina	Visa not required	90 days	
Armenia	eVisa/Visa on arrival	120 days	
Australia and territories	Visa required		May apply online (Online Visitor e600 visa).
Austria	Visa not required	90 days	90 days within any 180 day period in the Schengen Area
Azerbaijan	Visa required		According to Henley Passport Index, Saint Vincent and the Grenadines can get eVisa to Azerbaijan but not in this official listed countries
Bahamas	Visa not required	3 months	Extension of stay is possible.
Bahrain	eVisa		
Bangladesh	Visa on arrival		
Barbados	Visa not required	6 months	Holders of Caricom Certificate of Skills can stay indefinitely.
Belarus	Visa not required	30 days	Must arrive and depart via Minsk International Airport.
Belgium	Visa not required	90 days	90 days within any 180 day period in the Schengen Area
Belize	Visa not required		Holders of Caricom Certificate of Skills can stay indefinitely.
Benin	eVisa	30 days	Must have an international vaccination certificate.
Bhutan	eVisa	90 days	Must pay 100 USD per person per day for sustainable development fee
Bolivia	Visa on arrival	90 days	
Bosnia and Herzegovina	Visa not required	90 days	
Botswana	Visa not required	90 days	90 days within any year period
Brazil	Visa not required	90 days	
Brunei	Visa required		
Bulgaria	Visa not required	90 days	90 days within any 180 day period in the Schengen Area
Burkina Faso	eVisa	1 month	
Burundi	Visa on arrival		
Cambodia	Visa on arrival / eVisa	30 days	Visa is also obtainable online.
Cameroon	eVisa		
Canada	Visa required		
Cape Verde	Visa on arrival		Not available at all entry points.
Central African Republic	Visa required		
Chad	Visa required		
Chile	Visa not required	90 days	
China	Visa required		
Colombia	Visa not required	90 days	Can be extended up to 180 days
Comoros	Visa on arrival		
Republic of the Congo	Visa required		
Democratic Republic of the Congo	eVisa	7 days	
Costa Rica	Visa not required	90 days	
Côte d'Ivoire	eVisa		can be picked up at the Port Bouet Airport in Abidjan
Croatia	Visa not required	90 days	90 days within any 180 day period in the Schengen Area
Cuba	Visa not required	30 days	
Cyprus	Visa not required	90 days	90 days within any 180 day period
Czech Republic	Visa not required	90 days	90 days within any 180 day period in the Schengen Area
Denmark and territories	Visa not required	90 days	90 days within any 180 day period in the Schengen Area
Djibouti	eVisa	31 days	
Dominica	Visa not required	Freedom of movement for OECS states; ID card valid	
Dominican Republic	Visa not required	30 days	Can be extended up to 120 days
Ecuador	Visa not required	90 days	
Egypt	Visa on arrival	30 days	Visa not required when visiting as part of the tourist group that consists of at least 10 citizens who hold a return ticket, booked accommodation and a signed guarantee letter from a travel agency.
El Salvador	Visa not required	180 days	
Equatorial Guinea	eVisa		Must arrive via Malabo International Airport, processing fee 75 USD
Eritrea	Visa required		
Estonia	Visa not required	90 days	90 days within any 180 day period in the Schengen Area
Eswatini	Visa required		
Ethiopia	eVisa	up to 90 days	eVisa holders must arrive via Addis Ababa Bole International Airport
Fiji	Visa not required	4 months	
Finland	Visa not required	90 days	90 days within any 180 day period in the Schengen Area
France	Visa not required	90 days	90 days within any 180 day period in the Schengen Area
Gabon	eVisa		Electronic visa holders must arrive via Libreville International Airport.
Gambia	Visa not required	90 days	
Georgia	Visa not required	1 year	
Germany	Visa not required	90 days	90 days within any 180 day period in the Schengen Area
Ghana	Visa not required	60 days	
Greece	Visa not required	90 days	90 days within any 180 day period in the Schengen Area
Grenada	Visa not required	Freedom of movement for OECS states; ID card valid	
Guatemala	Visa not required	90 days	
Guinea	eVisa	90 days	
Guinea-Bissau	Visa on arrival	90 days	
Guyana	Visa not required	6 months	Holders of Caricom Certificate of Skills can stay indefinitely.
Haiti	Visa not required	3 months	
Honduras	Visa not required	90 days	
Hungary	Visa not required	90 days	90 days within any 180 day period in the Schengen Area
Iceland	Visa not required	90 days	90 days within any 180 day period in the Schengen Area
India	e-Visa	30 days	e-Visa holders must arrive via 32 designated airports (Note: Ahmedabad; Amritsar; Bagdogra; Bengaluru; Bhubaneswar; Chandigarh; Chennai; Coimbatore; Delhi; Gaya; Goa-Dabolim; Goa-Manohar; Guwahati; Hyderabad; Indore; Jaipur; Kannur; Kochi; Kolkata; Kozhikode; Lucknow; Madurai; Mangaluru; Mumbai; Nagpur; Port Blair; Pune; Surat; Thiruvananthapuram; Tiruchirappalli; Varanasi; Visakhapatnam) or 5 designated seaports. (Note: Chennai; Cochin; Mormugao (Goa); Mumbai; Mangalore); An Indian e-Tourist Visa may only be obtained twice within 1 calendar year.; Foreigners of Pakistani origin or who hold a Pakistani Passport are not eligible for an e-Visa. Foreigners who are not Pakistani nationals, but whose parents or grandparents (either paternal or maternal) were born in, or were permanent residents in Pakistan, are also not eligible for an e-Visa.
Indonesia	Visa required		
Iran	eVisa	30 days	Extension of stay is possible twice for 30 days for a total of up to 90 days
Iraq	eVisa		
Ireland	Visa not required	90 days	
Israel	Electronic Travel Authorization	90 days	
Italy	Visa not required	90 days	90 days within any 180 day period in the Schengen Area
Jamaica	Visa not required		Holders of Caricom Certificate of Skills can stay indefinitely.
Japan	Visa required		
Jordan	eVisa / Visa on arrival	30 days	Conditions apply.; Not available at all entry points.
Kazakhstan	eVisa		
Kenya	Visa not required	3 months	
Kiribati	Visa not required	90 days	90 days in any calendar year period
North Korea	Visa required		
South Korea	K-ETA	90 days	
Kuwait	Visa required		
Kyrgyzstan	eVisa	30 days or 60 days	Electronic visa holders must arrive via Manas International Airport or Osh Airport or through land crossings with China (at Irkeshtam and Torugart), Kazakhstan (at Ak-jol, Ak-Tilek, Chaldybar, Chon-Kapka), Tajikistan (at Bor-Dobo, Kulundu, Kyzyl-Bel) and Uzbekistan (at Dostuk).
Laos	eVisa / Visa on arrival	30 days	18 (Note: Savannakhet Airport; Lanetoui - Mengkang (China); Meuangmom - Wan Pong (Myanmar); Banvang - Ban Khok Phai (Thailand); Namngeun - Huay Kon (Thailand); Paksan - Bueng Kan (Thailand); Paktaphan - Pak Saeng (Thailand); Pangmon - Ban Huak (Thailand); Phoudou (Thailand); Dak ta ock - Nam Giang (Vietnam); La Lai (Vietnam); Namkan (Vietnam); Namphao - Cau Treo (Vietnam); Namsoy - Na Meo (Vietnam); Naphao - Cha Lo (Vietnam); Pahang - Long Sap (Vietnam); Panghok - Tây Trang (Vietnam); Phoukeua - Bo Y (Vietnam)) of the 33 border crossings are only open to regular visa holders.; e-Visa may be used to enter Laos through the Luang Prabang, Pakse and Vientiane international airports, 3 Thai-Lao Friendship Bridges (Note: Vientiane (Friendship Bridge 1); Savannakhet (Friendship Bridge 2); Bokeo (Friendship Bridge 4)), in Boten (road and railroad), and in Vientiane (at Khamsavath railway station).; Visa on arrival is available at the Luang Prabang, Pakse and Vientiane international airports, 4 Thai-Lao Friendship Bridges (Note: Vientiane (Friendship Bridge 1); Savannakhet (Friendship Bridge 2); Khammouane (Friendship Bridge 3); Bokeo (Friendship Bridge 4)) and 7 border crossings. (Note: Nongnokkheane - Trapeang Kriel (Cambodia); Boten - Bo han (China); Golden Triangle/Samliemkham (Thailand); Khamsavath railway station (Thailand); Namheuang - Ban Na Kraseng (Thailand); Vang tao - Chongmek (Thailand); Dansavan - Lao Bảo (Vietnam))
Latvia	Visa not required	90 days	90 days within any 180 day period in the Schengen Area
Lebanon	Visa required		
Lesotho	Visa not required	90 days	
Liberia	Visa required		
Libya	eVisa	30 days	
Liechtenstein	Visa not required	90 days	90 days within any 180 day period in the Schengen Area
Lithuania	Visa not required	90 days	90 days within any 180 day period in the Schengen Area
Luxembourg	Visa not required	90 days	90 days within any 180 day period in the Schengen Area
Madagascar	eVisa / Visa on arrival	90 days	
Malawi	Visa not required	90 days	
Malaysia	Visa not required	30 days	
Maldives	Visa on arrival	30 days	
Mali	Visa required		
Malta	Visa not required	90 days	90 days within any 180 day period in the Schengen Area
Marshall Islands	Visa on arrival	90 days	
Mauritania	eVisa		Available at Nouakchott–Oumtounsy International Airport.
Mauritius	Visa not required	180 days	180 days per calendar year for business, 120 days per calendar year for tourism
Mexico	Visa required		180 days visa free if hold a valid visa or permanent residence of the Schengen Area, Canada, Japan, the United Kingdom or the United States and the only permanent residence of Colombia or Peru
Micronesia	Visa not required	30 days	
Moldova	Visa not required	90 days	90 days within any 180 day period
Monaco	Visa not required		
Mongolia	eVisa	30 days	
Montenegro	Visa not required	90 days	
Morocco	Visa required		
Mozambique	eVisa / Visa on arrival	30 days	
Myanmar	Visa required		
Namibia	Visa required		
Nauru	Visa required		
Nepal	Visa on arrival / eVisa	90 days	Not available at all entry points.
Netherlands	Visa not required	90 days	90 days within any 180 day period in the Schengen Area
New Zealand	Visa required		Holders of an Australian Permanent Resident Visa or Resident Return Visa may be granted a New Zealand Resident Visa on arrival permitting indefinite stay (pursuant to the Trans-Tasman Travel Arrangement), subject to meeting character requirements and obtaining an Electronic Travel Authority prior to departure.
Nicaragua	Visa not required	90 days	
Niger	Visa required		
Nigeria	eVisa		
North Macedonia	Visa required		15 days visa free if hold a valid Type "C" multiple-entry visa for the Schengen Area or a temporary/permanent residence permit of an EU Member State or a country signatory of the Schengen Agreement
Norway	Visa not required	90 days	90 days within any 180 day period in the Schengen Area
Oman	Visa required		
Pakistan	Online Visa	90 days	free of charge
Palau	Visa on arrival	30 days	
Panama	Visa not required	180 days	
Papua New Guinea	Easy Visitor Permit	30 days	
Paraguay	Visa required		
Peru	Visa not required	90 days	
Philippines	Visa not required	30 days	
Poland	Visa not required	90 days	90 days within any 180 day period in the Schengen Area
Portugal	Visa not required	90 days	90 days within any 180 day period in the Schengen Area
Qatar	eVisa		
Romania	Visa not required	90 days	90 days within any 180 day period in the Schengen Area
Russia	Visa not required	90 days	90 days within any 180 day period
Rwanda	Visa not required	30 days	
Saint Kitts and Nevis	Visa not required	Freedom of movement for OECS states; ID card valid	
Saint Lucia	Visa not required	Freedom of movement for OECS states; ID card valid	
Samoa	Entry Permit on arrival	60 days	
San Marino	Visa not required		
São Tomé and Príncipe	eVisa		
Saudi Arabia	Visa required		
Senegal	Visa on arrival	90 days	
Serbia	Visa not required	30 days	30 days within any year period
Seychelles	Visitor's Permit on arrival	3 months	
Sierra Leone	Visa on arrival / eVisa	1 month	
Singapore	Visa not required	30 days	
Slovakia	Visa not required	90 days	90 days within any 180 day period in the Schengen Area
Slovenia	Visa not required	90 days	90 days within any 180 day period in the Schengen Area
Solomon Islands	Visitor's permit on arrival	3 months	
Somalia	eVisa	30 days	All visitors must have an approved Electronic Visa (eTAS) before the start of their journey.
South Africa	Visa not required	90 days	
South Sudan	Electronic Visa		Obtainable online; Printed visa authorization must be presented at the time of travel
Spain	Visa not required	90 days	90 days within any 180 day period in the Schengen Area
Sri Lanka	ETA/ Visa on arrival	30 days	
Sudan	Visa required		
Suriname	Visa not required	6 months	Holders of Caricom Certificate of Skills can stay indefinitely.
Sweden	Visa not required	90 days	90 days within any 180 day period in the Schengen Area
Switzerland	Visa not required	90 days	90 days within any 180 day period in the Schengen Area
Syria	eVisa	90 days	
Tajikistan	Visa not required	30 days	60 days eVisa also available.
Tanzania	Visa not required	90 days	
Thailand	Visa required		
Timor-Leste	Visa on arrival	30 days	Not available at all entry points.
Togo	eVisa	15 days	
Tonga	Visa on arrival	31 days	<
Trinidad and Tobago	Visa not required	6 months	Holders of Caricom Certificate of Skills can stay indefinitely.
Tunisia	Visa required		
Turkey	eVisa	90 days	
Turkmenistan	Visa required		
Tuvalu	free visa on arrival	1 month	
Uganda	Visa not required	3 months	
Ukraine	Visa not required	90 days	90 days within 180 days
United Arab Emirates	Visa not required	90 days	90 days within 180 days
United Kingdom and Crown dependencies	Electronic Travel Authorisation	6 months	
United States	Visa required		
Uruguay	Visa not required	90 days	
Uzbekistan	Visa not required	30 days	
Vanuatu	Visa not required	120 days	
Vatican City	Visa not required		
Venezuela	Visa not required	90 days	
Vietnam	eVisa	90 days	30 days visa free when visit Phu Quoc Island
Yemen	Visa required		
Zambia	Visa not required	90 days	
Zimbabwe	Visa not required	3 months	Strictly tourism purposes only.

== Dependent, Disputed, or Restricted territories ==
Unrecognised or partially recognised countries

Territory	Conditions of access	Notes
Abkhazia	Visa required	
Kosovo	Visa not required	90 days
Northern Cyprus	Visa not required	
Palestine	Visa not required	Arrival by sea to Gaza Strip not allowed.
Sahrawi Arab Democratic Republic		Undefined visa regime in the Western Sahara controlled territory.
Somaliland	Visa on arrival	30 days for 30 US dollars, payable on arrival.
South Ossetia	Visa not required	Multiple entry visa to Russia and three day prior notification are required to enter South Ossetia.
Taiwan	Visa not required	30 days; Holders of Saint Vincent and the Grenadines passport with "place of birth" recorded on the passport data page as Afghanistan, mainland China, Iran, Iraq, Libya, Nigeria, Pakistan, Syria and Yemen are ineligible for the visa exemption and must obtain a visa.
Transnistria	Visa not required	Registration required after 24h.

Dependent and autonomous territories

Territory	Conditions of access	Notes
China
Hong Kong	Visa not required	90 days
Macau	Visa on arrival	30 days
Denmark
Faroe Islands	Visa not required	90 days
Greenland	Visa not required	90 days
France
French Guiana	Visa not required	90 days
French Polynesia	Visa not required	90 days
(France) French West Indies	Visa not required	Visa free for overseas departments of Guadeloupe and Martinique; Visa required for overseas collectivities of Saint Barthélemy and Saint Martin
Mayotte	Visa not required	90 days
New Caledonia	Visa not required	90 days
Réunion	Visa not required	90 days
Saint Pierre and Miquelon	Visa not required	90 days
Wallis and Futuna	Visa not required	90 days
Netherlands
Aruba	Visa not required	90 days
Caribbean Netherlands	Visa not required	Includes Bonaire, Sint Eustatius and Saba.
Curaçao	Visa not required	90 days
Sint Maarten	Visa not required	90 days
New Zealand
Cook Islands	Visa not required	31 days
Niue	Visa not required	30 days
Tokelau	Visa required	
United Kingdom
Akrotiri and Dhekelia	Visa not required	Stays longer than 28 days per 12-month period require a permit.
Anguilla	Visa not required	3 months
Bermuda	Visa not required	6 months
British Indian Ocean Territory	Special permit required	Special permit required.
British Virgin Islands	Visa not required	1 month
Cayman Islands	Visa not required	6 months
Falkland Islands	Visa required	
Gibraltar	Visa not required	6 months
Montserrat	Visa not required	
Pitcairn Islands	Visa not required	14 days visa free and landing fee 35 USD or tax of 5 USD if not going ashore.
Ascension Island	eVisa	3 months within any year period
Saint Helena	Visitor's Pass required	Visitor's Pass granted on arrival valid for 4/10/21/60/90 days for 12/14/16/20/25 pound sterling.
Tristan da Cunha	Permission required	Permission to land required for 15/30 pounds sterling (yacht/ship passenger) for Tristan da Cunha Island or 20 pounds sterling for Gough Island, Inaccessible Island or Nightingale Islands.
South Georgia and the South Sandwich Islands	Permit required	Pre-arrival permit from the Commissioner required (72 hours/1 month for 110/160 pounds sterling).
Turks and Caicos Islands	Visa not required	90 days
United States
American Samoa	Visa required	
Guam	Visa required	
Northern Mariana Islands	Visa required	
Puerto Rico	Visa required	
U.S. Virgin Islands	Visa required	
Antarctica and adjacent islands
Special permits required for Bouvet Island, British Antarctic Territory, French Southern and Antarctic Lands, Argentine Antarctica, (Australia) Australian Antarctic Territory, (Antártica Chilena Province) Chilean Antarctic Territory, (Australia) Heard Island and McDonald Islands, (Norway) Peter I Island, (Norway) Queen Maud Land, (New Zealand) Ross Dependency.

== Vaccination ==
Many African countries, including Angola, Benin, Burkina Faso, Cameroon, Central African Republic, Chad, Democratic Republic of the Congo, Republic of the Congo, Côte d'Ivoire, Equatorial Guinea, Gabon, Ghana, Guinea, Liberia, Mali, Mauritania, Niger, Rwanda, São Tomé and Príncipe, Senegal, Sierra Leone, Uganda, Zambia require all incoming passengers to have a current International Certificate of Vaccination. Some other countries require vaccination only if the passenger is coming from an infected area.

== Fingerprinting ==
Several countries including Argentina, Cambodia, Japan, Malaysia, Saudi Arabia, South Korea and the United States demand all passengers to be fingerprinted on arrival.

== Passport validity ==
Many countries require passport validity of no less than 6 months and one or two blank pages. Countries requiring passport validity of at least 6 months on arrival include Afghanistan, Algeria, Bhutan, Botswana, Brunei, Cambodia, Comoros, Côte d'Ivoire, Ecuador, Egypt, El Salvador, Fiji, Guyana, Indonesia, Iran, Iraq (except when arriving at Basra - 3 months and Erbil or Sulaimaniyah - on arrival), Israel, Kenya, Laos, Madagascar, Malaysia, Marshall Islands, Myanmar, Namibia, Nicaragua, Nigeria, Oman, Palau, Papua New Guinea, Philippines, Rwanda, Saint Lucia, Samoa, Saudi Arabia, Singapore, Solomon Islands, Sri Lanka, Suriname, Taiwan, Tanzania, Timor-Leste, Tonga, Tuvalu, Uganda, Vanuatu, Venezuela, Vietnam, countries requiring passport validity of at least 4 months on arrival include Micronesia, Zambia, countries requiring passport validity of at least 3 months on arrival include Georgia, Honduras, Iceland, Jordan, Kuwait, Lebanon, Moldova, Nauru, Panama, United Arab Emirates and countries requiring passport validity of at least 1 month on arrival include Eritrea, Hong Kong, Macao, New Zealand, South Africa. Other countries require either a passport valid on arrival or passport valid throughout the period of intended stay.

== See also ==
- Visa policy of Saint Vincent and the Grenadines
- Saint Vincent and the Grenadines passport
