= Garraway Hotel =

- Location within Dominica

General information
- Location: Dame Eugenia Charles Boulevard, Roseau, Dominica
- Coordinates: 15°17′44″N 61°23′13″W
- Inaugurated: 1994

Website
- Official site

Garraway Hotel is a hotel located on the quayside of Roseau, Dominica. It lies between the Fort Young Hotel (to the east) and right next to The Dominica Museum (to the west). In the colonial period this area was part of the Fort Young from 1770. This hotel was built in 1994. Located in a mint green and white building, the five-storey hotel contains 31 rooms. The hotel contains an interior courtyard, rooftop terrace, the Balisier Creole cuisine restaurant on the second floor, a duty-free shop on the ground floor and the Ole Jetty Bar. The rooms are fitted with king-sized beds or double beds, with rattan furniture and floral-print fabrics.

It is operated by the Garraway family, descendants of James Garraway, who in the 1840s was the first 'man of colour' to serve as President of Dominica.

== See also ==
- List of hotels in the Caribbean
