= Meads Bay Pond =

Wetland in Anguilla

Coordinates: 18°10′45″N 63°08′12″W

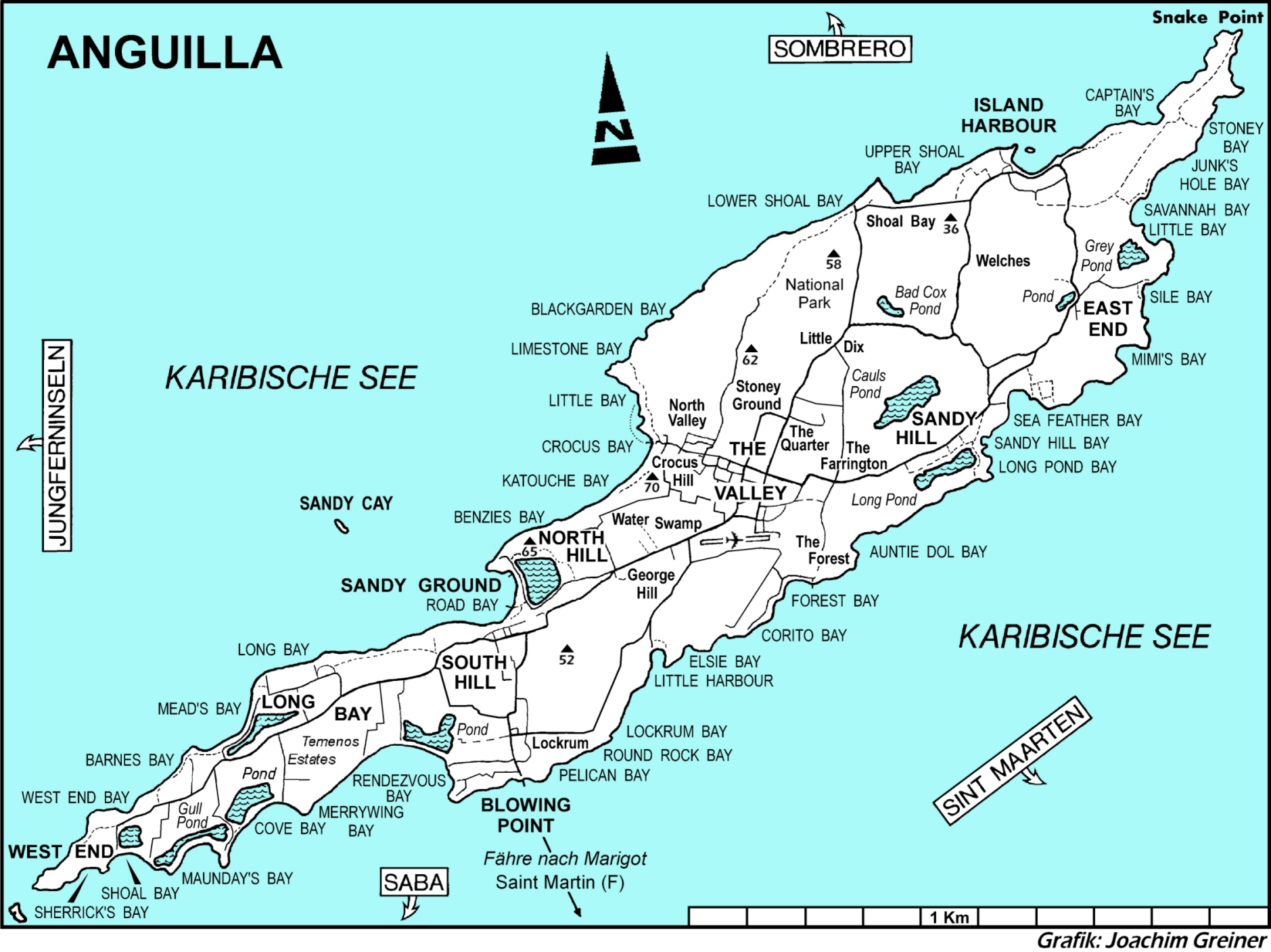
Map of Anguilla showing the pond next to Meads Bay at the south-western end of the island

Meads Bay Pond is a wetland in Anguilla, a British Overseas Territory in the Caribbean Sea. It is one of the territory's Important Bird Areas (IBAs).

== Description ==
The pond is a narrow, 21 ha brackish lagoon next to Long Bay Village, near the south-western end of the main island. Its north-western shore is separated from Meads Bay by a thin strip of land, a former dune, that carries a road and tourism developments. The substrate is marl on the northern side and limestone on the southern. Vegetation around the pond consists mainly of stands of buttonwood mangroves, with some longspine acacia and grey nicker at the western end.

=== Birds ===
The IBA was identified as such by BirdLife International because it supports a small breeding colony of least terns as well as non-breeding royal terns.
