= Belmond Cap Juluca =

Hotel in Cap Juluca, Anguilla

Coordinates: 18.1657°N 63.1447°W

Cap Juluca, A Belmond Hotel
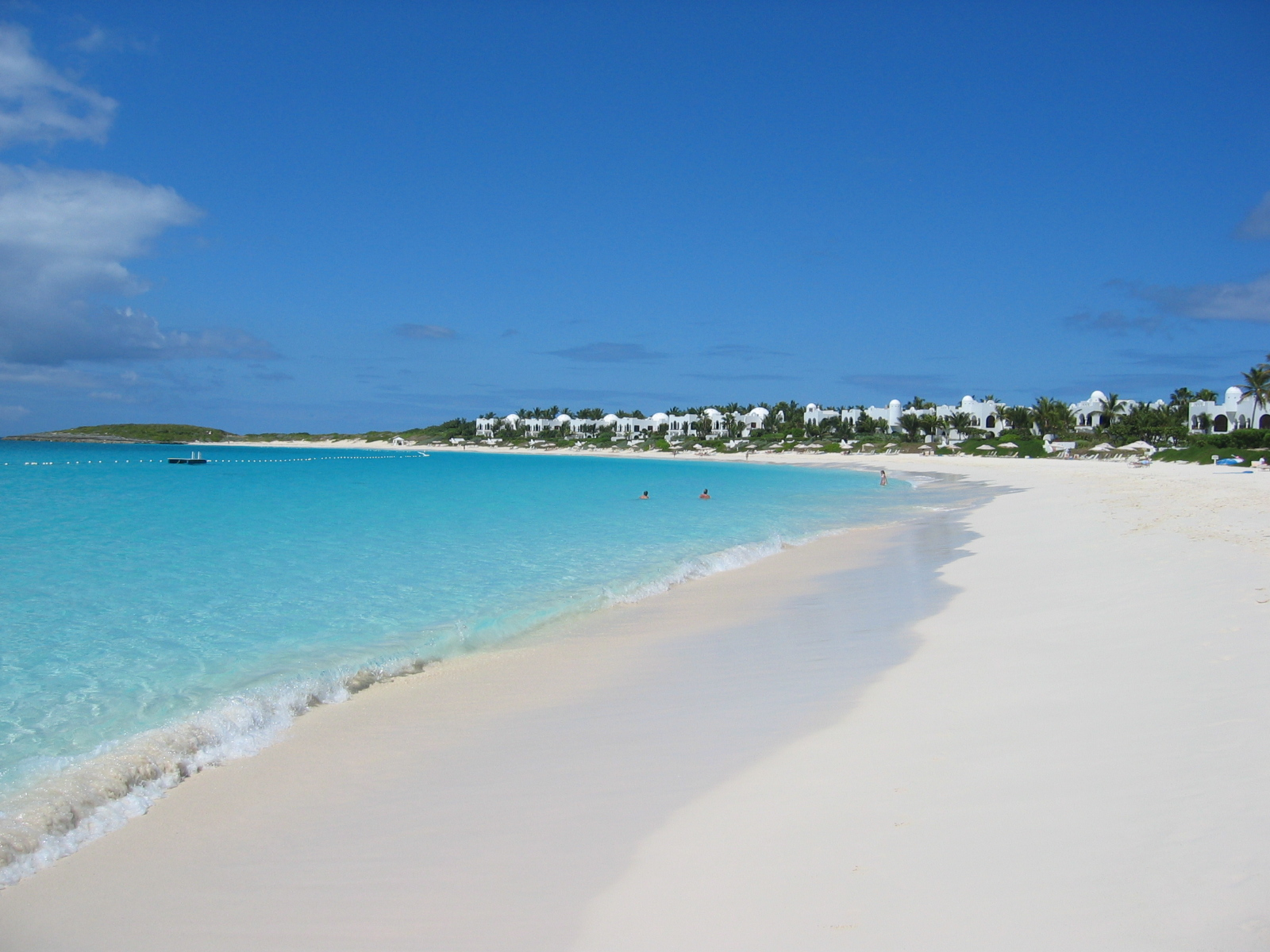
- View of the beach
- Interactive map of the Cap Juluca, A Belmond Hotel area

General information
- Location: Cap Juluca, Anguilla
- Owner: Belmond

Cap Juluca, A Belmond Hotel, is a five-star resort located on Maundays Bay in Anguilla. Cap Juluca is named for the rainbow spirit of the Arawak, Anguilla's earliest inhabitants. According to local lore, "Juluca" was a mystical being covered with fine colorful feathers who brought luck to fishermen. The original hotel was located in a white stucco building, with Moorish arches and domes .
