= Peruvian passport =

Passport issued to citizens of Peru

Peruvian passport; Pasaporte peruano
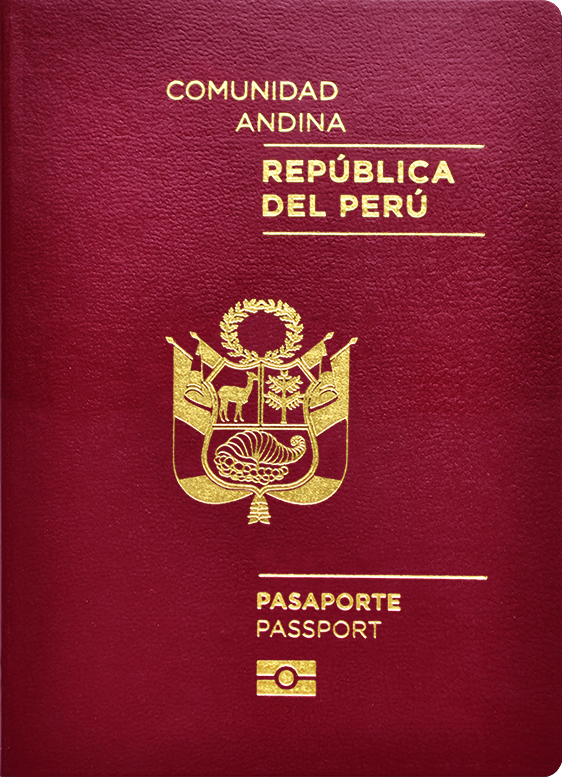
- The front cover of a Peruvian biometric passport issued since 2016.

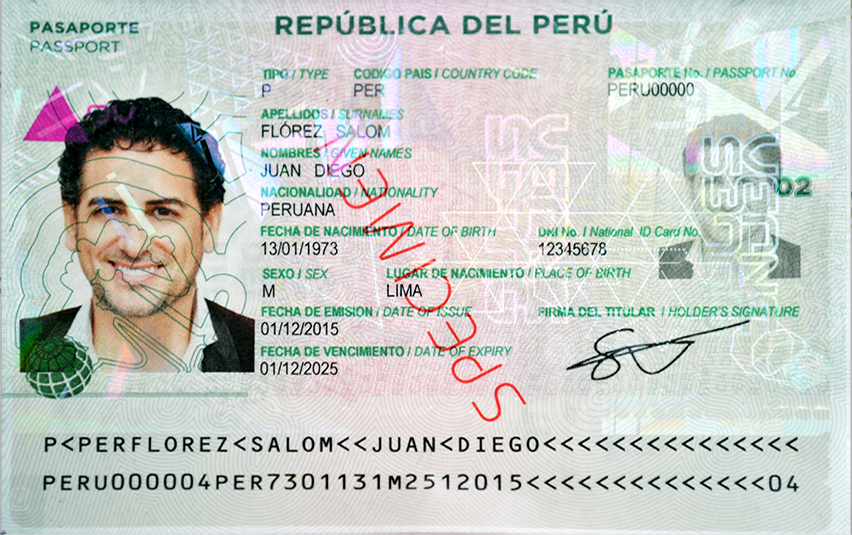
- The data page of a contemporary Peruvian biometric passport
- Type: Passport
- Issued by: Peru - Superintendencia Nacional de Migraciones
- First issued: 8 July 2016 (biometric passport)
- Purpose: Identification
- Valid in: Worldwide
- Eligibility: Peruvian citizenship
- Expiration: 10 years after issuance for citizens aged 18 and above; 5 years for citizens aged 12 to 17; 3 years for citizens under 12.
- Cost: S/ 98.60 (27 USD approx.) for 5-year passport. S/ 120.90 (33 USD approx.) for 10-year passport. (Starting May 7, 2024)

Peruvian passport (Spanish: Pasaporte peruano) is a travel document issued to citizens of Peru with the purpose of identification and to travel outside the country. It is issued by the Superintendencia Nacional de Migraciones, the Peruvian immigration and naturalization authority, which is part of the Ministry of the Interior. The Peruvian passport has the benefit of "visa free" status for member nations of the Andean Community and Mercosur, as well as several Central American nations.

Alternatively, a document called an Andean Migration Card can be used at any Andean airport, with which Peruvian citizens can travel freely throughout the territory of the Andean Community.

== Types ==
- Ordinary passport (Spanish: Pasaporte Ordinario Electrónico o Biométrico) - Issued for ordinary travel, such as vacations and business trips
- Special passport (Spanish: Pasaporte Especial) - Issued to individuals representing the Peruvian government on official business
- Diplomatic passport (Spanish: Pasaporte Diplomático) - Issued to Peruvian diplomats, top ranking government officials and diplomatic couriers
- Safe-passage document (Spanish: Salvoconducto) - Issued to Peruvian citizens abroad who do not have a passport for emergency travel back to Peru.

Other types of passports established by international agreements also exist. A non-biometric passport, known as a mechanized passport (Spanish: Pasaporte Mecanizado), was issued until July 7, 2016.

Peruvian citizens abroad who must travel for an emergency but who do not have a passport due to loss, damage, or theft, can request a salvoconducto (safe-passage document). Salvoconductos are issued in all of Peru's local consular offices. They are emergency passports granted with the purpose of allowing the traveler to return to Peru or to their usual country of residence. A salvoconducto expires within 30 days of issuance. The salvoconducto may be kept by Peru's migration agents after the holder arrives in Peru.

== Physical appearance ==
Peruvian passports are burgundy, with the coat of arms of Peru emblazoned on the front cover. The words "COMUNIDAD ANDINA" (English: Andean Community) and "REPÚBLICA DEL PERÚ" (English: Republic of Peru) are inscribed above the coat of arms. Below the coat of arms, the words "PASAPORTE" (English: passport) and "PASSPORT" are visible. Since 2016 they are biometric passports.

== Visa requirements map ==
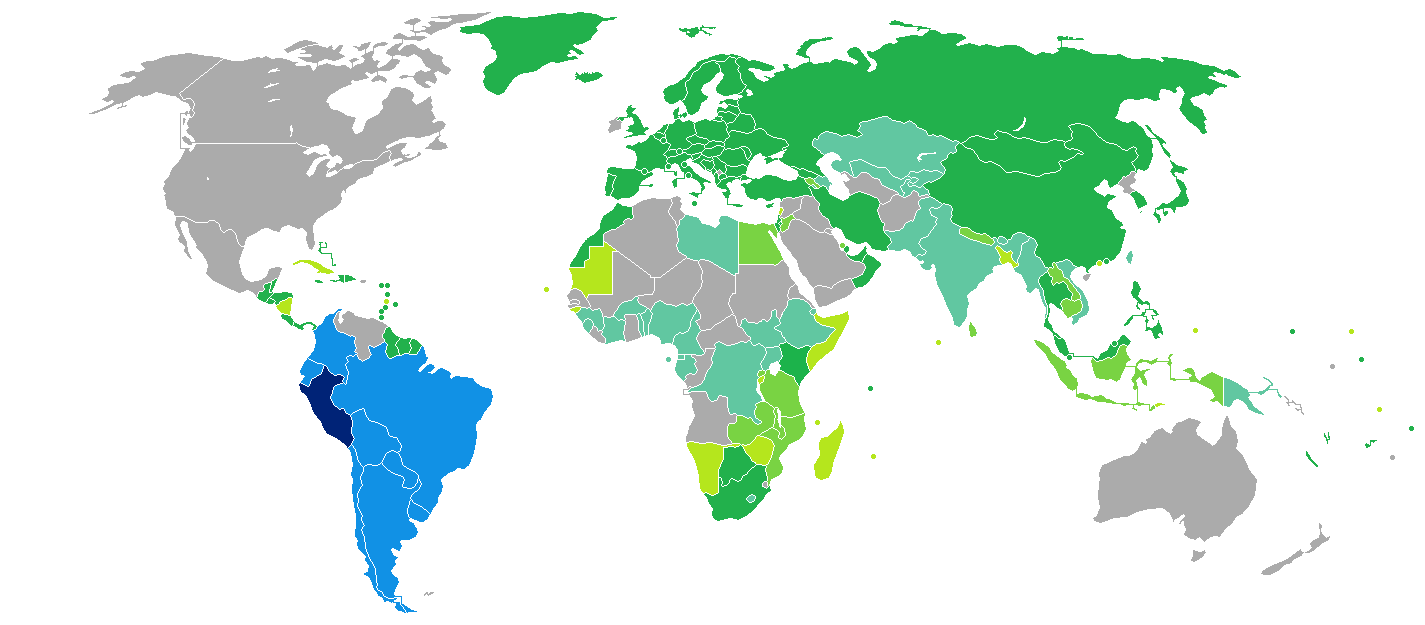
Visa requirements for Peruvian citizens Republic of Peru ID card travel Visa not required Visa on arrival eVisa Visa available both on arrival or online Visa required

As of 2024, Peruvian citizens have visa-free or visa on arrival access to 142 countries and territories, ranking the Peruvian passport 6th in South America and 35th in terms of world travel freedom according to the Henley Passport Index.

Peruvian citizens can legally live and work in member states of the Andean Community (Bolivia, Colombia and Ecuador) and member countries of Mercosur (Argentina, Brazil, Paraguay and Uruguay), as well as associate members (Chile), without any requirement other than be a citizen at birth or a naturalized citizen for more than 5 years and pass a background check.

== Application ==
To apply for a Peruvian passport, one needs a national ID (DNI) and the proof of the payment for the passport fee. Then with both documents, one must enter the Migraciones website to book an appointment (normally granted the same day) which also requires both documents. No forms need be filled. The passport is issued the day of the appointment.

Peruvians living abroad can apply at a Peruvian consulate. Issuance abroad takes about three weeks.

== Andean Migration Card ==
An Andean Migration Card (Spanish: Tarjeta Andina de Migración, TAM) is a migration document issued and valid in the Andean Community's member states: Bolivia, Colombia, Ecuador and Peru. The document can be presented to migration authorities instead of a passport for travel between these countries.

== Gallery ==
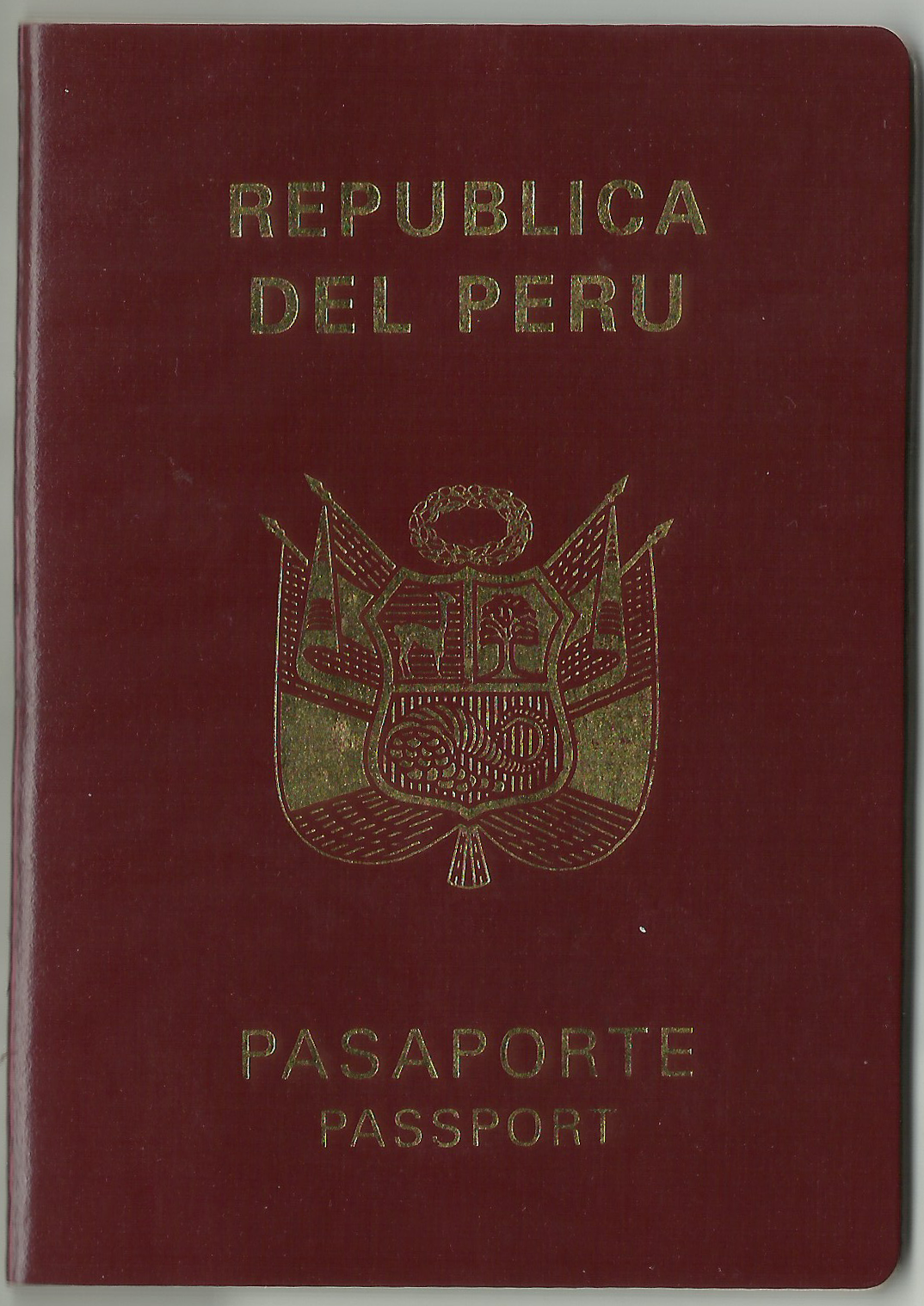
Peruvian Passport issued during the 1990s

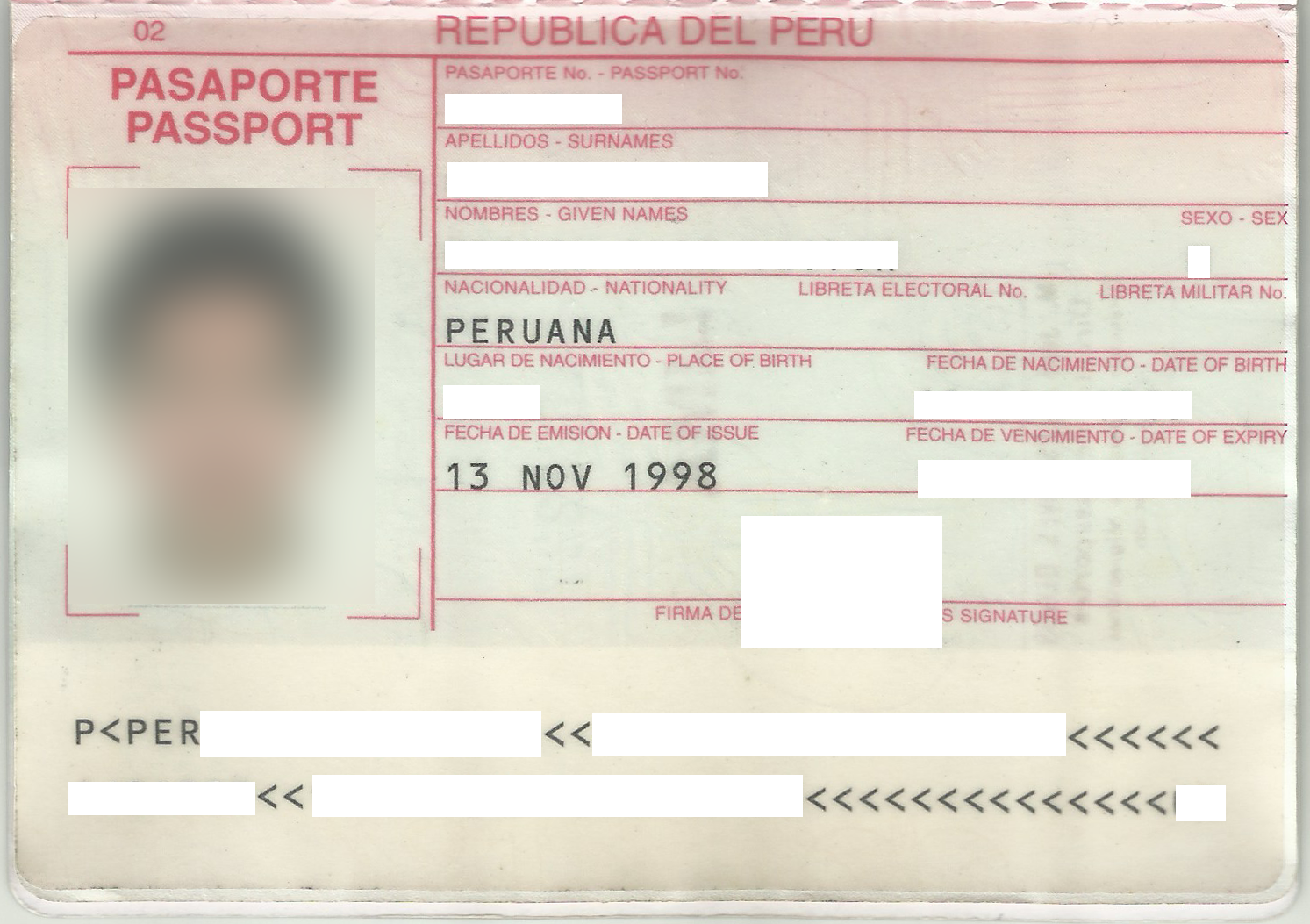
Data Sheet from a 1998 Peruvian Passport, still in use with salvoconductos

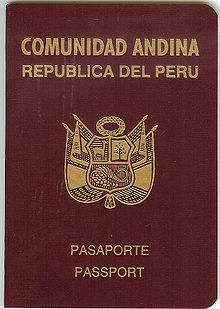
Peruvian Passport issued during the 2000s

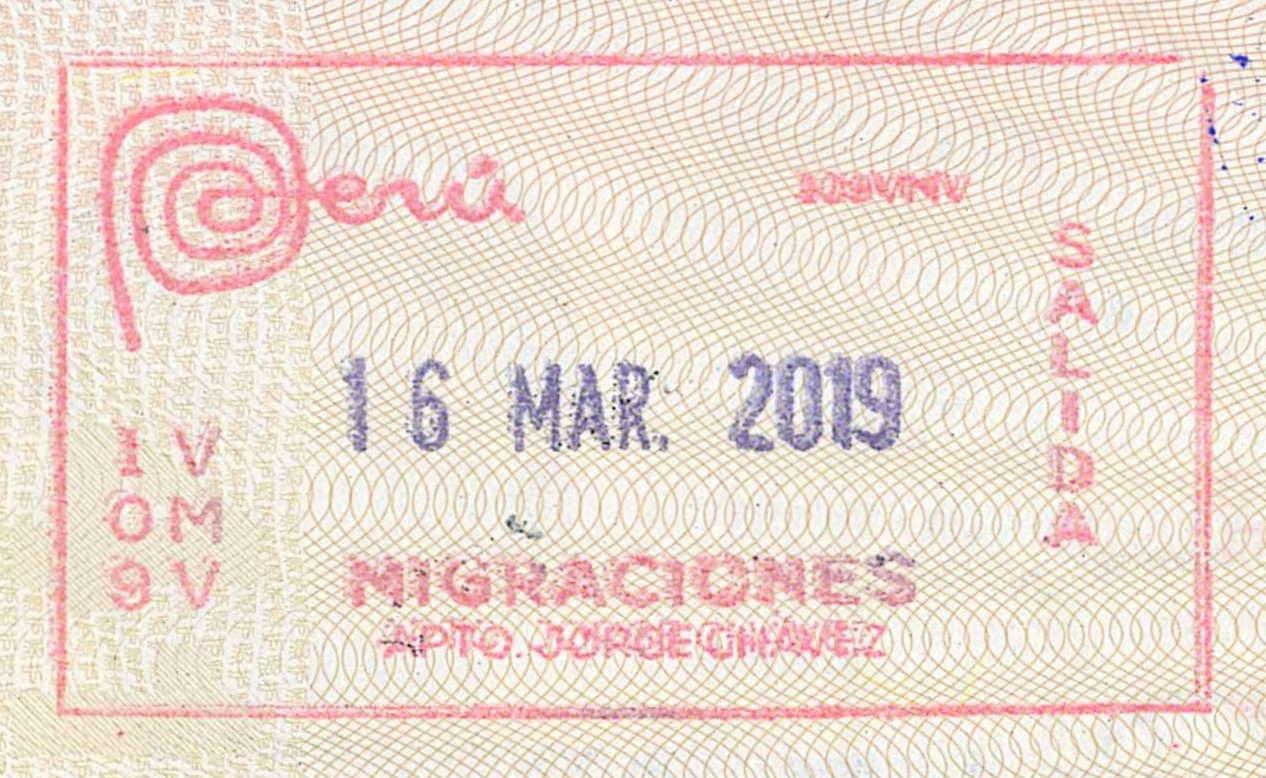
Peruvian exit stamp

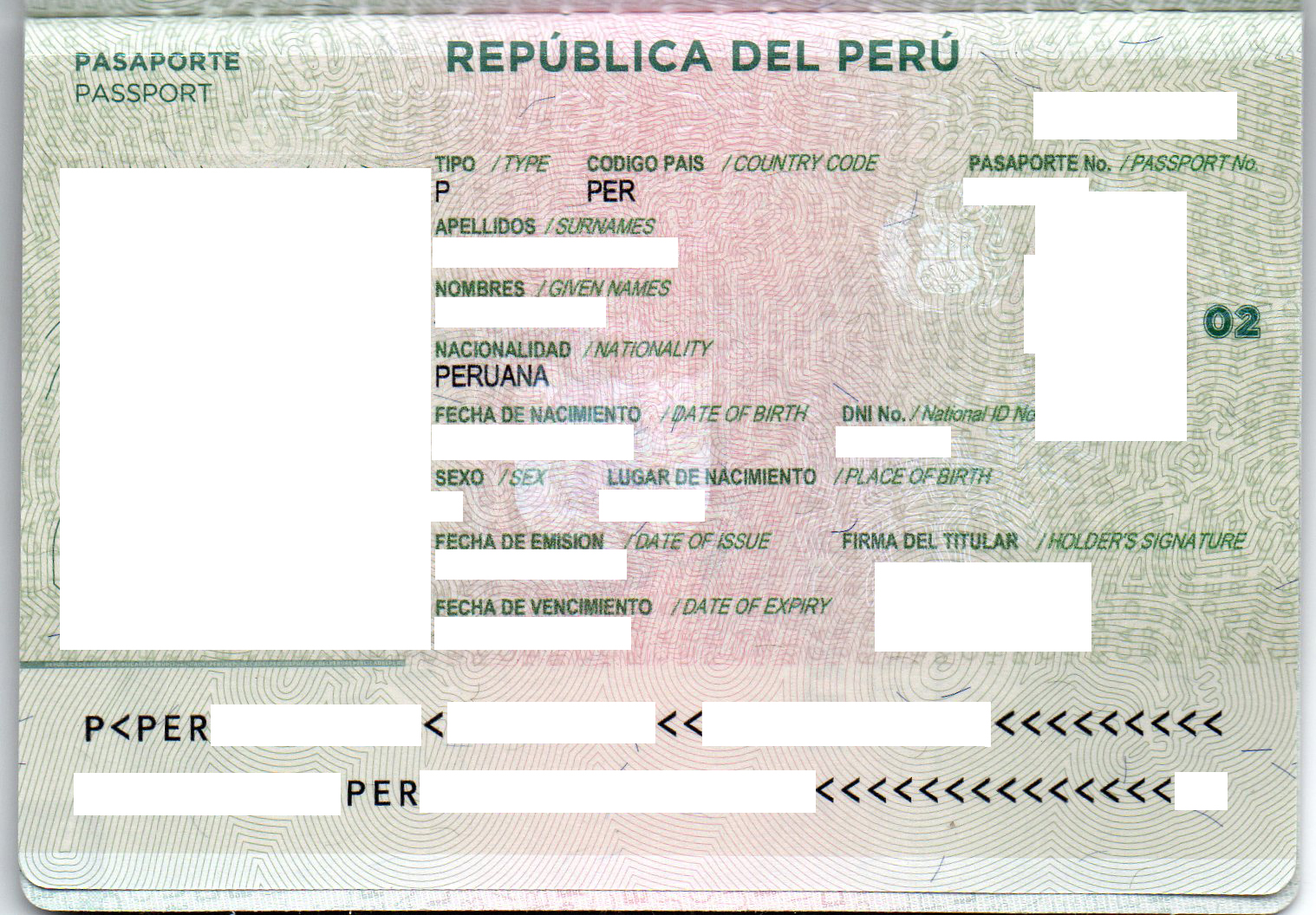
Data Sheet from a 2018 Peruvian Passport
