= Visa policy of Saint Vincent and the Grenadines =

Policy on permits required to enter Saint Vincent and the Grenadines

Most visitors to Saint Vincent and the Grenadines may enter without a visa. However, citizens of certain countries must obtain a visa from one of the Saint Vincent and the Grenadines diplomatic missions.

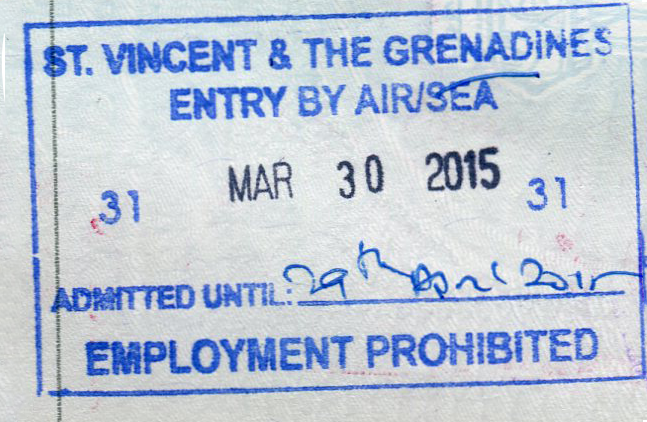
Entry stamp

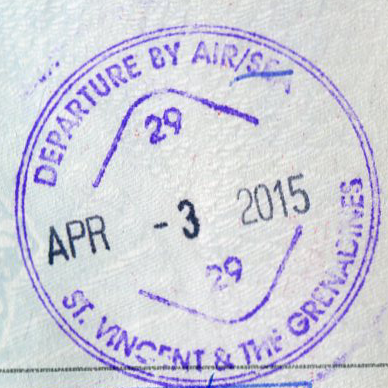
Exit stamp

== Visa policy map ==
Visa policy of Saint Vincent and the Grenadines Saint Vincent and the Grenadines Freedom of movement Visa not required (6 months) Visa not required (3 months) Visa required

== Visa exemption ==
Holders of passports of the following countries may enter Saint Vincent and the Grenadines without a visa for the following period:

Freedom of movement

- Antigua and Barbuda
- Barbados
- Belize
- Dominica
- Grenada
- Saint Kitts and Nevis
- Saint Lucia

6 months

- All European Union member states (except Ireland)

- Bahamas
- Guyana (Note: Holders of Caricom Certificate of Skills may stay indefinitely.)
- Iceland
- Jamaica
- Liechtenstein
- Norway
- Suriname
- Switzerland
- Trinidad and Tobago
- United Kingdom
- United States

3 months

Citizens of other countries and territories may enter Saint Vincent and the Grenadines without a visa for up to 3 months, which can be extended for a fee.

== Visa required in advance ==
Citizens of the following countries and territories must obtain a visa prior to arrival. A fee of EC$200.00 is required to obtain a visa.

- Afghanistan
- Cameroon
- China
- Dominican Republic
- Haiti
- Iran
- Iraq
- Lebanon
- Nigeria
- Palestine (Note: Listed in Timatic as visa required.)
- Syria

== See also ==
- Visa requirements for Saint Vincent and the Grenadines citizens
