= Visa policy of Peru =

Policy on permits required to enter Peru

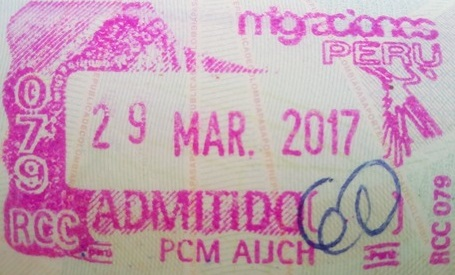
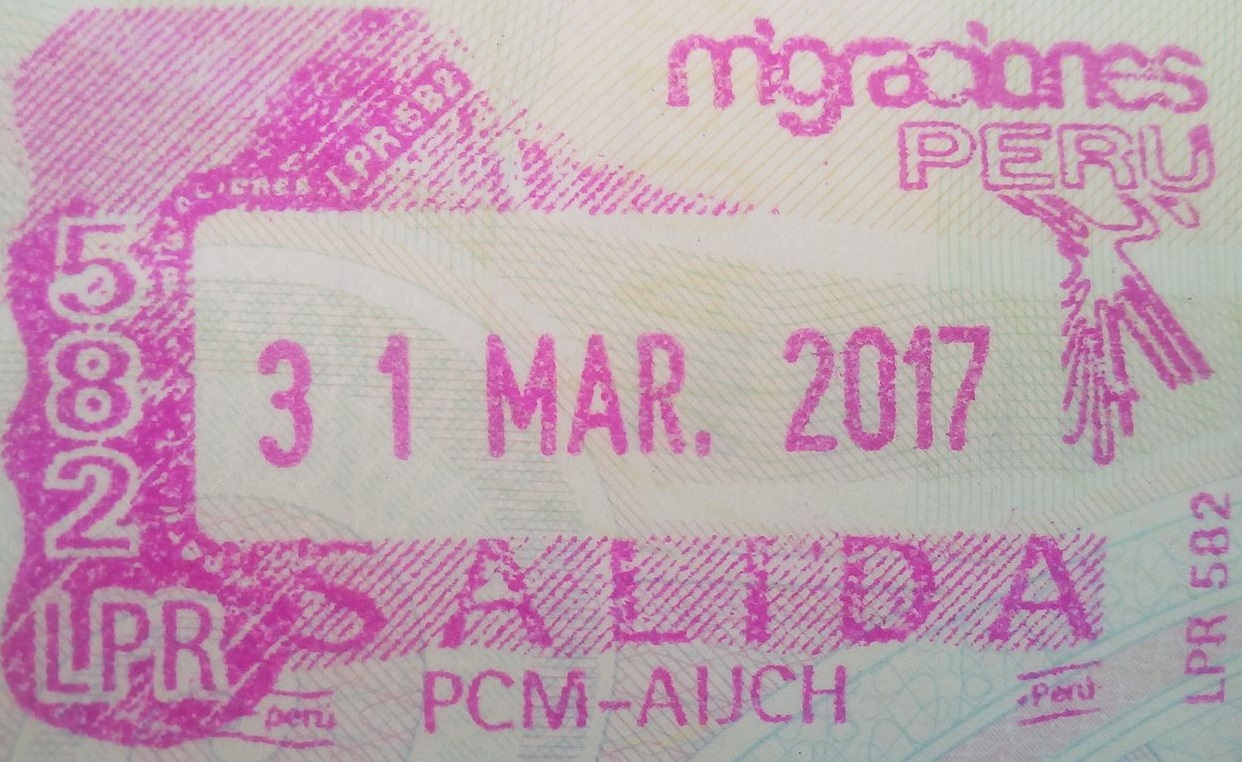
Entry and exit stamps

Visitors to Peru must obtain a visa from one of the Peruvian diplomatic missions unless they are citizens of one of the visa-exempt countries.

== Visa policy map ==
Visa policy of Peru Peru Visa not required - may enter with an ID card (90 days) Visa not required (183 days) Visa not required (90 days) Visa not required (60 days) Visa not required (180 days) if holding a valid visa or residence permit issued by any Schengen Area member state, Australia, Canada, the UK or the US; otherwise, visa required Visa required

== Visa exemption ==
=== Ordinary passports ===
Citizens of the following countries and territories may enter Peru without a visa for tourist purposes for the following period:

183 days

- El Salvador^{1}
- Mexico^{B 1}
- Qatar^{1}

90 days

- European Union member states^{B 2} (except Ireland)

- Andorra^{4}
- Antigua and Barbuda^{4}
- Argentina^{ID 4}
- Australia^{4}
- Bahamas^{4}
- Barbados^{3}
- Belarus^{4}
- Belize^{4}
- Bolivia^{ID 4}
- Brazil^{ID B 4}
- Brunei^{4}
- Canada^{4}
- Chile^{ID B 6}
- Colombia^{ID B 6}
- Cook Islands^{4}
- Costa Rica^{3}
- Dominica^{4}
- Ecuador^{ID 4}
- Fiji^{4}
- Georgia^{2}
- Grenada^{4}
- Guatemala^{4}
- Guyana^{4}
- Honduras^{3}
- Hong Kong^{4}
- Iceland^{B 2}
- Indonesia^{B 4}
- Ireland^{4}
- Israel^{4}
- Jamaica^{4}
- Japan^{B 6}
- Kiribati^{4}
- Liechtenstein^{B 2}
- Malaysia^{B 4}
- Marshall Islands^{4}
- Micronesia^{4}
- Moldova^{4}
- Monaco^{4}
- Mongolia^{4}
- Montenegro^{4}
- Nauru^{4}
- New Zealand^{4}
- Niue^{4}
- North Macedonia^{4}
- Norway^{B 2}
- Palau^{4}
- Panama^{B 3}
- Papua New Guinea
- Paraguay^{ID 4}
- Philippines^{4}
- Russia^{2}
- Saint Kitts and Nevis^{4}
- Saint Lucia^{4}
- Saint Vincent and the Grenadines^{4}
- Samoa^{4}
- San Marino^{4}
- Serbia^{4}
- Singapore^{B 5}
- Solomon Islands^{4}
- South Africa^{4}
- South Korea^{4}
- Suriname^{4}
- Switzerland^{B 2}
- Taiwan^{4}
- Thailand^{4}
- Tonga^{4}
- Trinidad and Tobago^{4}
- Turkey^{2}
- Tuvalu^{4}
- Ukraine^{2}
- United Arab Emirates^{4}
- United Kingdom^{4}
- United States^{4}
- Uruguay^{ID 4}
- Vanuatu^{4}
- Vatican City^{4}

60 days

- Dominican Republic^{7}

_{ID - May enter with an ID card in lieu of a passport.}
_{B - May enter without a visa for business purposes as well.}
_{1 - 183 days within any 365-day period.}
_{2 - 90 days within any 180-day period.}
_{3 - 90 days within any 365-day period.}
_{4 - 90 days, extendable to 180 days within any 365-day period.}
_{5 - 90 days, extendable to 180 days within any 365-day period for tourist purposes, 90 days within any 365-day period for business purposes.}
_{6 - 90 days, extendable to 180 days within any 365-day period for tourist purposes, 183 days within any 365-day period for business purposes.}
_{7 - 60 days within any 365-day period.}

Date of visa changes
- 1 June 1957: Belgium
- 1 March 1961: Mexico
- 1 May 1968: Israel
- 23 January 1970: Colombia
- 10 February 1972: Barbados
- 13 June 1982: South Korea
- 1 January 1991: Taiwan
- 1 December 1991: Dominican Republic
- 19 July 1999: Thailand
- 4 July 2009: Israel
- 3 November 2010: Panama
- 20 June 2011: Russia
- 12 June 2013: Turkey
- 17 July 2014: Honduras
- 13 December 2015: Costa Rica
- 1 September 2017: Guatemala
- 8 November 2020: United Arab Emirates
- 1 October 2021: Mongolia
- 28 November 2023: El Salvador
- 13 July 2025: Qatar

Cancelled:

- France: 1 April 1958 - 12 January 1982
- Spain: 1 May 1959 - 15 February 1992
- Sweden: 1 January 1959 - 1 January 1996
- Venezuela: 15 June 2019

==== Substitute visa ====
Citizens of China and India may enter Peru without a visa for tourist or business purposes for up to 180 days within any 365-day period if they hold a visa or residence permit issued by any Schengen Area member state, Australia, Canada, the United Kingdom or the United States. In addition, the document must be valid for a minimum period of up to 6 months from the date of arrival in Peru.

Citizens of Morocco may enter Peru without a visa for tourist or business purposes for up to 183 days within any 1-year period if they hold a valid visa issued by any Schengen Area member state or the United States. In addition, the document must be valid for a minimum period of up to 6 months from the date of arrival in Peru.

=== Non-ordinary passports ===
In addition to countries whose citizens are visa-exempt, holders of diplomatic or official/service passports of Albania, Algeria, Azerbaijan, Cambodia, China, Cuba, Egypt, Haiti, India, Jordan, Kuwait, Laos, Morocco, Nicaragua, Oman, Palestine, Tunisia, Venezuela and Vietnam may enter Peru without a visa.

=== APEC Business Travel Card ===
Holders of passports issued by the following countries who possess an APEC Business Travel Card (ABTC) containing the "PER" code on the reverse that it is valid for travel to Peru may enter Peru without a visa for business trips for up to 90 days.

ABTCs are issued to citizens of:

- Australia
- Brunei
- Chile
- China
- Hong Kong
- Indonesia
- Japan
- South Korea
- Malaysia
- Mexico
- New Zealand
- Papua New Guinea
- Philippines
- Russia
- Singapore
- Taiwan
- Thailand
- Vietnam

== Visitor statistics ==
Most visitors arriving in Peru were from the following countries of nationality:

Country	2017	2016	2015	2014
Chile	1,101,055	1,055,880	984,584	903,793
United States	598,685	586,479	545,212	514,227
Ecuador	288,987	318,172	256,127	223,995
Argentina	205,465	175,488	170,960	155,931
Colombia	200,812	189,754	165,384	151,876
Venezuela	196,495	59,192	42,111	48,411
Brazil	173,753	148,296	148,312	147,875
Bolivia	146,660	136,805	128,943	126,689
Spain	147,214	144,927	138,902	131,174
France	96,283	92,316	88,921	82,260
Mexico	93,763	87,443	76,368	67,016
Total	4,032,339	3,744,461	3,455,709	3,214,934

== See also ==
- Visa requirements for Peruvian citizens
