= Solomon Islands passport =

Solomon Islands travel document

- Solomon Islands biometric passport front cover
- Type: Passport
- Issued by: Solomon Islands
- Purpose: Identification
- Eligibility: Solomon Islands citizenship
- Expiration: 10 years

The Solomon Islands passport is a document issued by Solomon Islands, a Melanesian state in the south-west Pacific Ocean, to its citizens for the purposes of international travel.

As of 1 January 2017, Solomon Islands citizens had visa-free or visa on arrival access to 116 countries and territories, ranking the Solomon Islands passport 42nd in terms of travel freedom according to the Henley visa restrictions index.

== See also ==
- Visa requirements for Solomon Islands citizens
