= Kiribati passport =

Passport issued to citizens of Kiribati

- Kiribati passport front cover
- Type: Passport
- Issued by: Kiribati
- Purpose: Identification
- Eligibility: I-Kiribati citizenship

The Kiribati passport is an international travel document issued for citizens of Kiribati.

== Visa requirements ==
By January 2020, Kiribati had visa-free or visa-on-arrival access to 122 countries and dependencies, making the Kiribati passport ranking 48th on the Visa Restrictions Index.

== See also ==
- Visa requirements for Kiribati citizens
