= Visa policy of Kiribati =

Policy on permits required to enter Kiribati

Visitors to Kiribati must obtain a visa unless they are citizens from one of the visa-exempt countries.

To enter Kiribati, the "expiry date" of the passport must have for at least 6 months from the date of arrival.

== Visa policy map ==
Visa policy of Kiribati Kiribati Visa not required (1 month) Visa required Admission refused

== Visa exemption ==
Citizens of the following countries and territories may enter Kiribati without a visa for up to 1 month. The maximum period of stay in Kiribati must not exceed 90 days within any 12-month period.

- All European Union member states

- Antigua and Barbuda
- Argentina
- Australia
- Bahamas
- Bangladesh
- Barbados
- Belize
- Bolivia
- Botswana
- Brazil
- Brunei
- Cameroon
- Canada
- Chile
- China
- Colombia
- Costa Rica
- Cuba
- Dominica
- Dominican Republic
- Egypt
- El Salvador
- Eswatini
- Fiji
- Gabon
- Gambia
- Ghana
- Grenada
- Guatemala
- Guyana
- Haiti
- Honduras
- Hong Kong
- Iceland
- India
- Indonesia
- Israel
- Jamaica
- Japan
- Kenya
- Lesotho
- Liechtenstein
- Macau
- Malawi
- Malaysia
- Maldives
- Marshall Islands
- Mauritius
- Mexico
- Micronesia
- Morocco
- Mozambique
- Namibia
- Nauru
- New Zealand
- Nigeria
- Norway
- Palau
- Panama
- Papua New Guinea
- Paraguay
- Peru
- Philippines
- Qatar
- Russia
- Rwanda
- Saint Kitts and Nevis
- Saint Lucia
- Saint Vincent and the Grenadines
- Samoa
- Saudi Arabia
- Seychelles
- Sierra Leone
- Singapore
- Solomon Islands
- South Africa
- South Korea
- Sri Lanka
- Suriname
- Switzerland
- Tanzania
- Thailand
- Timor-Leste
- Togo
- Tonga
- Trinidad and Tobago
- Tuvalu
- Uganda
- Ukraine
- United Arab Emirates
- United Kingdom
- United States
- Uruguay
- Vanuatu
- Venezuela
- Zambia

== Taiwan ==
Holders of passports issued by Taiwan are not allowed from entering Kiribati. The government of Kiribati no longer recognizes and accepts these passports, as Kiribati has recognized China.

== See also ==
- Visa requirements for Kiribati citizens
