= List of countries that regulate the immigration of felons =

This is a list of countries that regulate the immigration of felons.

- Australia excludes any person who has been sentenced to a term of imprisonment for 12 months or more.
- Canada excludes any person who has committed a non-summary offence, unless, after waiting until five years have elapsed since the expiration of any sentence imposed for the offence, they satisfy the Canadian Minister of Immigration that they are rehabilitated.
- China excludes any person who has terrorism, deportation, smuggling, drug trafficking, prostitution, bestiality or other felony convictions.
- Japan excludes any person who has been sentenced to a term of imprisonment for 12 months or more.
- New Zealand excludes:
  - any person who, at any time, was convicted and sentenced to imprisonment for 5 years or more, or an indeterminable period is capable of running for 5 years or more, and
  - any person who, in the past 10 years, was convicted and sentenced to imprisonment for 12 months or more.
- Russia excludes any person in the past 10 years who has been sentenced to a term of imprisonment for 12 months or more.
- South Korea may exclude:
  - any person who was convicted in South Korea and sentenced to imprisonment for less than 5 years until 5 years has passed since the end of the sentence, or imprisonment for 5 years or more until 10 years has passed since the end of the sentence. Indefinite entry ban is applied instead for any specified crime defined by Korean Minister of Justice until Minister approves ban removal.
  - any person from applying permanent residency who has been sentenced to pay a fine in the past 3 years, or probation or imprisonment until 5 years has passed since the end of the sentence, and cancel permanent residency for who violated Korean law and has been sentenced to imprisonment for total 3 years or more in the past 5 years, or imprisonment for 2 years or more for any specified crime, and deport any permanent resident who has been charged with any specified crime and has been to sentenced to imprisonment for 5 years or more.
  - any person from applying to become citizen who failed to prove their good behaviour, including any person with suspended indictment or discharge with warning in the past 2 years, or any person who has been sentenced to pay a fine in the past 5 years, or probation until 7 years has passed since the end of the sentence, or imprisonment until 10 years has passed since the end of the sentence.
- The United Kingdom's Immigration Rules mandate exclusion of any person who has been sentenced to 4 years or more in prison for a single offence; or has been convicted of an offence for which they have been sentenced to a period of imprisonment of at least 12 months but less than 4 years, unless a period of 10 years has passed since the end of the sentence; or has been convicted of an offence for which they have been sentenced to a period of imprisonment of less than 12 months, unless a period of 5 years has passed since the end of the sentence. There are limited exceptions where a refusal of entry would breach the Human Rights Convention or the Convention and Protocol Relating to the Status of Refugees, but otherwise it will only be in exceptional circumstances that the public interest in maintaining entry refusal will be outweighed by compelling factors.
- The United States does not allow aliens convicted of aggravated felonies to become citizens. See also Permanent residence (United States).

== See also ==
- UK immigration enforcement
- Non-visa travel restrictions
