= Visa policy of Solomon Islands =

Policy on permits required to enter Solomon Islands

Visitors to Solomon Islands must obtain an e-Visa unless they are citizens from one of the visa-exempt countries or citizens who may obtain a free visitor permit on arrival.

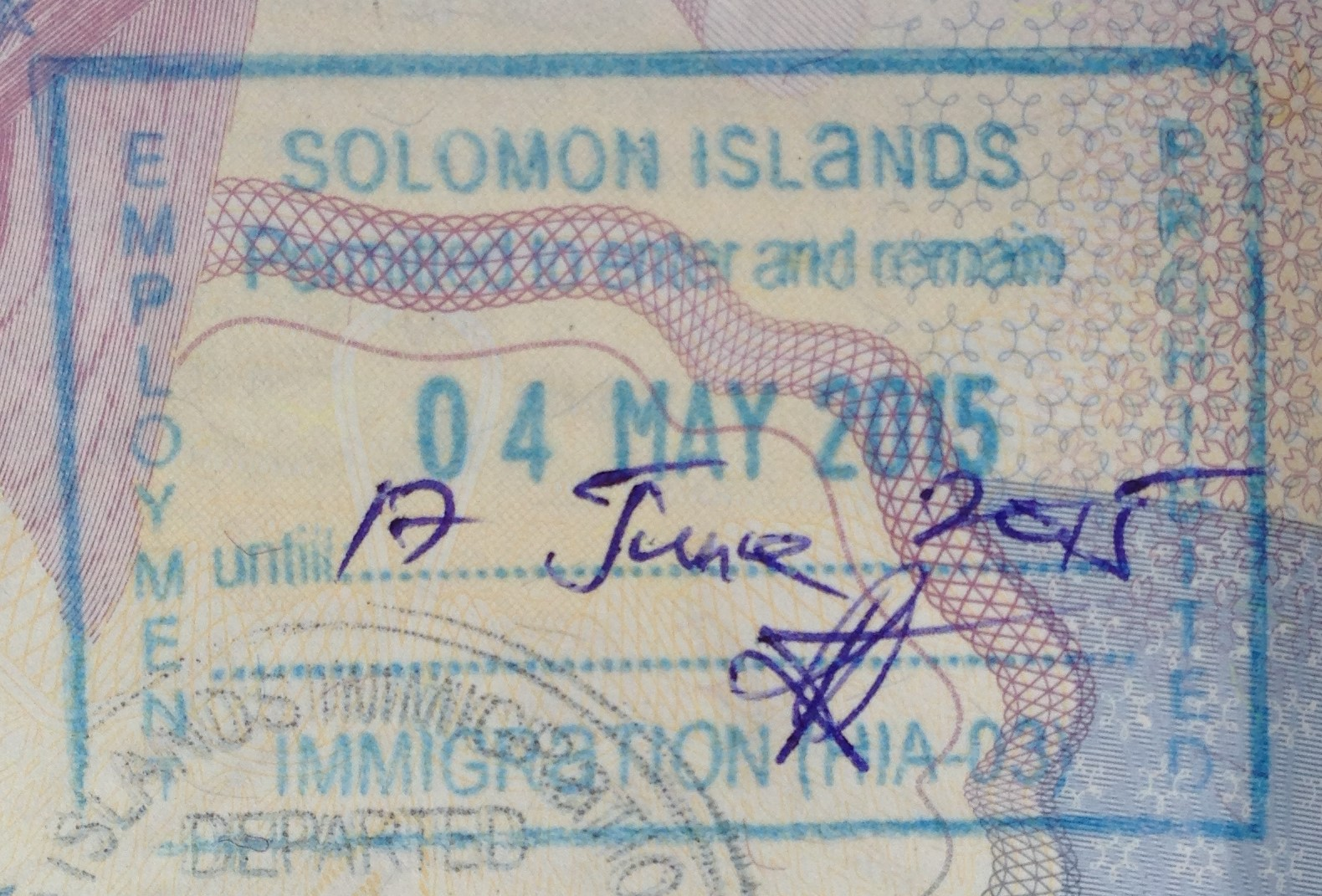
Entry stamp

Visitors may also apply for a visa from one of the Solomon Islands diplomatic missions.

All visitors must have a passport valid for at least 6 months.

== Visa policy map ==
Visa policy of Solomon Islands Solomon Islands Visa not required (90 days) Visa not required (30 days) Free Visitor Permit on arrival / eVisa eVisa

== Visa exemption ==
Citizens of the following countries and territories may enter Solomon Islands without a visa for the following period in accordance with bilateral agreements:

90 days

- United Arab Emirates

90 days within any 180 days

- European Union member states (except Ireland)

- Iceland
- Liechtenstein
- Norway
- Switzerland

90 days within any 6 months

- Israel

30 days

- China^{1}
- Hong Kong

_{1 - No more than 90 days within any 180-day period.}

Date of visa changes
- 7 October 2016: European Union member states (except Ireland), Iceland, Liechtenstein, Norway, Switzerland
- 29 January 2017: Israel
- 19 November 2017: United Arab Emirates
- 28 December 2024: China
- 26 August 2026: Hong Kong

Cancelled:

- April 2025: Taiwan (as Free Visitor Permit on arrival)

== Visa on arrival ==
=== Free Visitor Permit on arrival ===
Citizens of the following countries and territories may obtain a free visitor permit on arrival for 30 days. The maximum period of stay in the Solomon Islands must not exceed 90 days within any 12-month period.

- Andorra
- Antigua and Barbuda
- Argentina
- Australia
- Bahamas
- Barbados
- Belize
- Brazil
- Brunei
- Canada
- Dominica
- Dominican Republic
- Fiji
- Grenada
- Ireland
- Japan
- Kiribati
- Kuwait
- Malaysia
- Maldives
- Marshall Islands
- Micronesia
- Monaco
- Nauru
- New Zealand
- Palau
- Papua New Guinea
- Saint Kitts and Nevis
- Saint Lucia
- Saint Vincent and the Grenadines
- Samoa
- San Marino
- Singapore
- South Korea
- Thailand
- Tonga
- Trinidad and Tobago
- Tuvalu
- United Kingdom
- United States
- Vanuatu

== Electronic visa (e-Visa) ==
Citizens of other countries and territories may obtain an e-Visa. Online application and payment is now operational.

== Visitor statistics ==
Most visitors arriving in the Solomon Islands were from the following countries of nationality:

Rank	Country or territory	2017	2016	2015	2014	2013
1	Australia	10,161	9,539	9,509	9,134	11,181
2	New Zealand	1,696	1,544	1,451	1,406	1,905
3	Fiji	1,664	1,562	1,391	1,255	1,800
4	United States	1,623	1,484	1,413	1,137	1,161
5	Papua New Guinea	1,488	1,379	1,341	1,243	2,019
6	China	1,215	827	742	425	n/a
7	Vanuatu	766	868	609	529	804
8	Japan	715	552	581	505	601
9	United Kingdom	496	347	387	337	460
10	Canada	176	166	153	149	148
11	Germany	156	161	109	102	136
12	Hong Kong	149	99	93	95	81
13	France	119	117	177	86	93
	Total	25,709	23,194	21,623	20,070	24,431

== See also ==
- Visa requirements for Solomon Islands citizens
