= Visa requirements for Chilean citizens =

Administrative entry restrictions

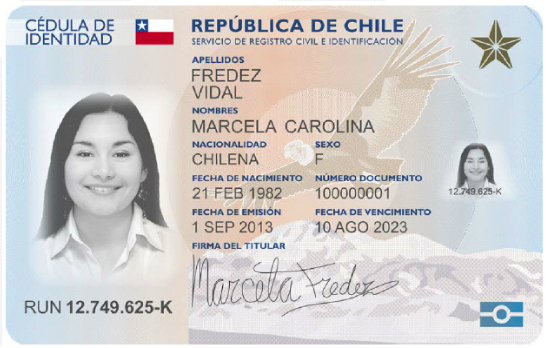
A Chilean identity card is valid for travel to most South American countries

Visa requirements for Chilean citizens are administrative entry restrictions by the authorities of other states placed on citizens of Chile entering with a Chilean passport.

As of 2026, Chilean citizens have visa-free or visa on arrival access to 174 countries and territories, ranking the Chilean passport 13th in the world according to the Henley Passport Index. The Chilean passport is the most powerful passport in Latin America and is the 3rd most powerful overall in the Americas, according to the Henley Passport Index.

As of 2026, the passports of Chile, Brunei, and South Korea, are the only ones to allow visa-free access to all 5 Permanent members of the United Nations Security Council countries.

Chile is also currently the only Latin American country that has both visa-waiver access to the United States and visa-free access to Canada. In addition, citizens of Chile do not need a passport when traveling to Argentina, Bolivia, Brazil, Colombia, Ecuador, Paraguay, Peru, or Uruguay, where they may just use their Cédula de Identidad or identity cards.

== Visa requirements map ==
Visa requirements for Chilean citizens holding ordinary passports Chile Freedom of movement (ID card travel) Visa not required / ESTA / ETA Visa on arrival eVisa Visa available both on arrival or online Visa required

== Visa requirements ==
Visa requirements for holders of normal passports travelling for tourist purposes:

Chile is an associated member of Mercosur. As such, its citizens enjoy unlimited access to any of the Mercosur full members countries of Argentina, Brazil, Paraguay or Uruguay and the other associated member countries of Bolivia, Colombia, Ecuador and Peru with the right to residence and work, with no requirement other than nationality.

Citizens of these nine countries (including Chile) may apply for a grant of "temporary residence" for up to 2 years in another country of the bloc. Then, they may apply for "permanent residence" just before the term of their "temporary residence" expires.

Country	Visa requirement	Allowed stay	Notes (excluding departure fees)
Afghanistan	eVisa	30 days	e-Visa : Visitors must arrive at Kabul International (KBL).; The Taliban accepts visas issued by diplomatic missions not under its control.
Albania	Visa not required	90 days	
Algeria	Visa required		Persons may be denied entry if entering with a passport containing visas or stamps issued by Israel.; Visitors on tours organized to some southern regions by an approved travel agency may obtain a visa on arrival for up to 30 days.; Persons may be denied entry if entering with a passport containing visas or stamps issued by Israel.
Andorra	Visa not required		
Angola	Visa not required	30 days	30 days per trip, but no more than 90 days within any 1 calendar year for tourism purposes only.; Visitors must have a return/onward ticket and a hotel reservation confirmation.; An International Certificate of Vaccination is required.
Antigua and Barbuda	Visa not required	1 month	Stringent application of rules regarding proof of sufficient funds, return ticket and accommodation.
Argentina	Visa not required	90 days	National ID card accepted.; Chileans can live and work legally in Argentina under the Mercosur (and Associated Members) immigration agreement with no requirement other than being a citizen at birth or a naturalized citizen for over 5 years, and passing a background check.; Visitors are fingerprinted (Right thumb fingerprint) and photographed upon entry.
Armenia	eVisa / Visa on arrival	120 days	Obtainable on arrival at Zvartnots International Airport or prior to travel online.
Australia	Visa required		May apply online (Online Visitor e600 visa).; Transit visa is not required.
Austria	Visa not required	90 days	90 days within any 180 day period in the Schengen Area.
Azerbaijan	eVisa	30 days	If staying in Azerbaijan for more than ten days, visitors must register at the State Migration Service within three days of arrival.; Applicants of Armenian ancestry or with Armenian visas in their passport may be denied a visa.; Travellers with a visa or evidence of travel to the now-defunct Republic of Artsakh (stamps) are permanently denied entry.
Bahamas	Visa not required	3 months	
Bahrain	eVisa / Visa on arrival	14 days	
Bangladesh	Visa on arrival	30 days	Not available at all entry points.; Available at Dhaka, Chittagong, and Sylhet international airports.
Barbados	Visa not required	6 months	
Belarus	Visa not required	30 days	Must arrive and depart via Minsk International Airport.
Belgium	Visa not required	90 days	90 days within any 180 day period in the Schengen Area.
Belize	Visa not required	90 days	
Benin	eVisa	30 days	Must have an international vaccination certificate.; Three types of electronic visa are offered: the e-Visa valid for 30 days for a single entry (50 EUR), the e-Visa valid for 30 days for several (multiple) entries (75 EUR), and the e-Visa valid for 90 days to make several (multiple) entries (100 EUR).
Bhutan	eVisa	90 days	The Sustainable Development Fee (SDF) of 200 USD per person, per night for almost all visitors to Bhutan. Additionally, if payment is made in US dollars from September 1, 2023 to August 31, 2027, the SDF is 100 USD.
Bolivia	Visa not required	90 days	National ID card accepted.; Chileans can live and work legally in Bolivia under the Mercosur (and Associated Members) immigration agreement with no requirement other than being a citizen at birth or a naturalized citizen for over 5 years, and passing a background check.
Bosnia and Herzegovina	Visa not required	90 days	90 days within any 6-month period.; Registration with the local police within 24 hours of arrival is mandatory.
Botswana	Visa not required	90 days	90 days within any year period.
Brazil	Visa not required	90 days	National ID card accepted.; Chileans can live and work legally in Brazil under the Mercosur (and Associated Members) immigration agreement with no requirement other than being a citizen at birth or a naturalized citizen for over 5 years, and passing a background check.
Brunei	Visa required		
Bulgaria	Visa not required	90 days	90 days within any 180 day period in the Schengen Area.
Burkina Faso	eVisa		International Certificate of Vaccination or Prophylaxis required.
Burundi	Online Visa / Visa on arrival	1 month	Visa on arrival obtainable at Bujumbura International Airport, and all land borders.
Cambodia	eVisa / Visa on arrival	30 days	Visa is also obtainable online.; All visitors are fingerprinted upon arrival and departure.
Cameroon	eVisa		International Certificate of Vaccination or Prophylaxis and current immunization records required.
Canada	eTA / Visa not required	6 months	eTA required if arriving by air.
Cape Verde	Visa required		
Central African Republic	Visa required		International Certificate of Vaccination or Prophylaxis required.
Chad	eVisa		
China	Visa not required	30 days	Visa-free from June 1, 2025 until December 31, 2026.; 240-hour (10-day) visa-free transit to a third country or region (including Hong Kong, Macau or Taiwan) using any mode of transport. Must have a confirmed onward ticket/itinerary, and enter through 1 of 64 approved ports.; During which, may freely travel within the 24 provinces permitted for visa-free transit and engage in tourism, business, and visits.; 24-hour visa-free transit to a third country or region (including Hong Kong, Macau, and Taiwan), is available at most international airports, without leaving the airport.; Travellers who need to leave the airport may obtain a temporary entry permit from immigration.; 5-day port visa (Visa on Arrival) for Shenzhen if arriving at designated ports of entry from Hong Kong by land or sea, for stays within Shenzhen.; 3-day port visa (Visa on Arrival) if arriving in Zhuhai or Xiamen at designated ports of entry, for stays within the respective city.; 15-day visa-free entry for cruise ship passengers in tour groups, if arriving at any cruise port along China's coastline, including but not limited to Tianjin; Dalian; Shanghai; Lianyungang; Wenzhou; Zhoushan; Xiamen; Qingdao; Guangzhou; Shenzhen; Beihai; Haikou; Sanya. May further travel inland to all regions of coastal provinces (and equivalents) and Beijing.; May apply for a port visa (Visa on Arrival) if travelling for an urgent, qualified reason. Prior clearance for port visa is highly recommended or may be denied boarding by airlines.
Colombia	Visa not required	90 days	National ID card accepted.; Chileans can live and work legally in Colombia under the Mercosur (and Associated Members) immigration agreement with no requirement other than being a citizen at birth or a naturalized citizen for over 5 years, and passing a background check.
Comoros	Visa on arrival	45 days	
Republic of the Congo	Visa required		International Certificate of Vaccination or Prophylaxis required.; A letter of invitation or written proof of a hotel reservation is required.
Democratic Republic of the Congo	eVisa	7 days	International Certificate of Vaccination or Prophylaxis required.; Registration required.
Costa Rica	Visa not required	90 days	
Côte d'Ivoire	eVisa	3 months	e-Visa holders must arrive via Port Bouet Airport.; International Certificate of Vaccination or Prophylaxis required.
Croatia	Visa not required	90 days	90 days within any 180 day period in the Schengen Area.
Cuba	eVisa	90 days	Can be extended up to 90 days with a fee.
Cyprus	Visa not required	90 days	90 days within any 180 day period.
Czech Republic	Visa not required	90 days	90 days within any 180 day period in the Schengen Area.
Denmark	Visa not required	90 days	90 days within any 180 day period regardless of previous time spent in other Schengen countries (except the other Nordic countries).
Djibouti	eVisa	90 days	
Dominica	Visa not required	21 days	
Dominican Republic	Visa not required	90 days	
Ecuador	Visa not required	180 days	National ID card accepted.; Chileans can live and work legally in Ecuador under the Mercosur (and Associated Members) immigration agreement with no requirement other than being a citizen at birth or a naturalized citizen for over 5 years, and passing a background check.; Extendable length of stay.
Egypt	eVisa / Visa on arrival	30 days	e-Visa issued for 30 days.; Visa-free travel for tourists arriving at Sharm El Sheikh, St. Catherine, or Taba airports and remaining in the Sinai resorts up to 15 days.
El Salvador	Visa not required	3 months	
Equatorial Guinea	eVisa		International Certificate of Vaccination or Prophylaxis required if you are traveling from a country with risk of yellow fever.
Eritrea	Visa required		Permit required to leave capital.
Estonia	Visa not required	90 days	90 days within any 180 day period in the Schengen Area.
Eswatini	Visa not required	30 days	
Ethiopia	eVisa	90 days	Visa on arrival is obtainable only at Addis Ababa Bole International Airport.; e-Visa holders must arrive via Addis Ababa Bole International Airport.; e-Visa is available for 30 or 90 days.; Visitors are fingerprinted.
Fiji	Visa not required	4 months	
Finland	Visa not required	90 days	90 days within any 180 day period in the Schengen Area.
France	Visa not required	90 days	90 days within any 180 day period in the Schengen Area.
Gabon	eVisa	90 days	e-Visas are available for one to six months.; e-Visa holders must arrive via Libreville International Airport.; International Certificate of Vaccination or Prophylaxis required.
Gambia	Visa required		An entry clearance must be obtained from the Gambian Immigration prior to travel.; International Certificate of Vaccination or Prophylaxis required only for travellers arriving high risk countries and having transited for more than 12 hours.
Georgia	Visa not required	90 days	90 days within any 180 day period.
Germany	Visa not required	90 days	90 days within any 180 day period in the Schengen Area.
Ghana	Visa required		International Certificate of Vaccination or Prophylaxis required.
Greece	Visa not required	90 days	90 days within any 180 day period in the Schengen Area.
Grenada	Visa not required	3 months	
Guatemala	Visa not required	90 days	
Guinea	eVisa	90 days	
Guinea-Bissau	Visa on arrival	90 days	
Guyana	Visa not required	90 days	
Haiti	Visa not required	3 months	
Honduras	Visa not required	3 months	
Hungary	Visa not required	90 days	90 days within any 180 day period in the Schengen Area.
Iceland	Visa not required	90 days	90 days within any 180 day period in the Schengen Area.
India	eVisa	30 days	e-Visa holders must arrive via 32 designated airports (Note: Ahmedabad; Amritsar; Bagdogra; Bengaluru; Bhubaneswar; Chandigarh; Chennai; Coimbatore; Delhi; Gaya; Goa-Dabolim; Goa-Manohar; Guwahati; Hyderabad; Indore; Jaipur; Kannur; Kochi; Kolkata; Kozhikode; Lucknow; Madurai; Mangaluru; Mumbai; Nagpur; Port Blair; Pune; Surat; Thiruvananthapuram; Tiruchirappalli; Varanasi; Visakhapatnam) or 5 designated seaports. (Note: Chennai; Cochin; Mormugao (Goa); Mumbai; Mangalore); An Indian e-Tourist Visa may only be obtained twice within 1 calendar year.; Foreigners of Pakistani origin or who hold a Pakistani Passport are not eligible for an e-Visa. Foreigners who are not Pakistani nationals, but whose parents or grandparents (either paternal or maternal) were born in, or were permanent residents in Pakistan, are also not eligible for an e-Visa.
Indonesia	e-VOA / Visa on arrival	30 days	
Iran	eVisa	30 days	Independent travelers must be accompanied by an authorized guide at all times.
Iraq	eVisa	30 days	As March 1 2023, all travelers traveling to the Kurdistan Region of Iraq will require a visa. Some citizens may obtain an e-Visa / visa on arrival, while others will need to apply an e-Visa through a guarantor (local sponsor).
Ireland	Visa not required	90 days	
Israel	Electronic Travel Authorization	3 months	Entry prohibited for any person "who knowingly issues a public call for boycotting Israel".
Italy	Visa not required	90 days	90 days within any 180 day period in the Schengen Area.
Jamaica	Visa not required	30 days	Departure tax collected by airline for all arrivals by air.
Japan	Visa not required	90 days	Persons who have been sentenced to 1 year or more of jail are not eligible for visa free travel to Japan and have to obtain visa.
Jordan	eVisa / Visa on arrival		Conditions apply.; Visa can be obtained upon arrival.; Not available at King Hussein/Allenby Bridge
Kazakhstan	Visa not required	30 days	Visa free was granted in 2014 under the Unilateral visa waiver for countries with high investment in Kazakhstan Economy
Kenya	Electronic Travel Authorisation	90 days	Applications can be submitted up to 90 days prior to travel and must be submitted at least 3 days in advance.; eTA fee is 32.50 USD.; Proof of reservation at the hotel where visitors plan to stay is required (if staying with friends, an invitation letter is also acceptable).; Yellow fever vaccination certificate is required if coming from endemic countries.
Kiribati	Visa not required	90 days	90 days within any 12-month period.; May not exceed 90 days within any 12 months period.
North Korea	Visa required		
South Korea	Electronic Travel Authorization	90 days	The validity period of a K-ETA is 3 years from the date of approval.
Kuwait	Visa required		
Kyrgyzstan	Visa not required	30 days	30 days within any 60-day period.
Laos	eVisa / Visa on arrival	30 days	18 (Note: Savannakhet Airport; Lanetoui - Mengkang (China); Meuangmom - Wan Pong (Myanmar); Banvang - Ban Khok Phai (Thailand); Namngeun - Huay Kon (Thailand); Paksan - Bueng Kan (Thailand); Paktaphan - Pak Saeng (Thailand); Pangmon - Ban Huak (Thailand); Phoudou (Thailand); Dak ta ock - Nam Giang (Vietnam); La Lai (Vietnam); Namkan (Vietnam); Namphao - Cau Treo (Vietnam); Namsoy - Na Meo (Vietnam); Naphao - Cha Lo (Vietnam); Pahang - Long Sap (Vietnam); Panghok - Tây Trang (Vietnam); Phoukeua - Bo Y (Vietnam)) of the 33 border crossings are only open to regular visa holders.; e-Visa may be used to enter Laos through the Luang Prabang, Pakse and Vientiane international airports, 3 Thai-Lao Friendship Bridges (Note: Vientiane (Friendship Bridge 1); Savannakhet (Friendship Bridge 2); Bokeo (Friendship Bridge 4)), in Boten (road and railroad), and in Vientiane (at Khamsavath railway station).; Visa on arrival is available at the Luang Prabang, Pakse and Vientiane international airports, 4 Thai-Lao Friendship Bridges (Note: Vientiane (Friendship Bridge 1); Savannakhet (Friendship Bridge 2); Khammouane (Friendship Bridge 3); Bokeo (Friendship Bridge 4)) and 7 border crossings. (Note: Nongnokkheane - Trapeang Kriel (Cambodia); Boten - Bo han (China); Golden Triangle/Samliemkham (Thailand); Khamsavath railway station (Thailand); Namheuang - Ban Na Kraseng (Thailand); Vang tao - Chongmek (Thailand); Dansavan - Lao Bảo (Vietnam))
Latvia	Visa not required	90 days	90 days within any 180 day period in the Schengen Area.
Lebanon	Free visa on arrival	1 month	1 month extendable for 2 additional months; Granted free of charge at Beirut International Airport or any other port of entry if there is no Israeli visa or seal, holding a telephone number, an address in Lebanon, and a non refundable return or circle trip ticket.
Lesotho	Visa required		
Liberia	e-VOA	3 months	International Certificate of Vaccination or Prophylaxis required only for travellers from high risk countries.; Pre-approved visa letter valid for 14 days from date of issuance is mandatory.
Libya	eVisa		Holders of passports bearing an Israeli visa or entry/exit stamps from Israel are not allowed to enter Libya.
Liechtenstein	Visa not required	90 days	90 days within any 180 day period in the Schengen Area.
Lithuania	Visa not required	90 days	90 days within any 180 day period in the Schengen Area.
Luxembourg	Visa not required	90 days	90 days within any 180 day period in the Schengen Area.
Madagascar	eVisa / Visa on arrival	90 days	For stays of 61 to 90 days, the visa fee is 59 USD.
Malawi	eVisa / Visa on arrival	30 days	Can extend for a total of 90 days.
Malaysia	Visa not required	1 month	All visitors are fingerprinted on arrival and departure.; Immigration offenses, such as visa overstaying, are punishable by caning.
Maldives	Free visa on arrival	30 days	
Mali	Visa required		
Malta	Visa not required	90 days	90 days within any 180 day period in the Schengen Area.
Marshall Islands	Visa on arrival	90 days	
Mauritania	eVisa	30 days	Available at Nouakchott–Oumtounsy International Airport.; International Certificate of Vaccination or Prophylaxis required only for travellers arriving from high risk countries
Mauritius	Visa not required	90 days	
Mexico	Visa not required	180 days	Visitors must obtain a Multiple Immigration Form. There is no charge for a tourist FMM for stays of less than 7 days when entering by land. For visitors staying more than 7 days and entering by land, it will cost 687 Mexican Pesos or nearly 40 USD. The FMM is required for all visitors entering via air, regardless of length of stay, and the cost is included in the traveler's airfare and remitted by the airline.
Micronesia	Visa not required	30 days	
Moldova	Visa not required	90 days	90 days within any 180 day period.
Monaco	Visa not required		
Mongolia	Visa not required	90 days	
Montenegro	Visa not required	90 days	
Morocco	Visa not required	3 months	
Mozambique	eVisa / Visa on arrival	30 days	Conditions apply.
Myanmar	eVisa	28 days	e-Visa holders must arrive via Yangon, Nay Pyi Taw or Mandalay airports or via land border crossings with Thailand — Tachileik, Myawaddy and Kawthaung or India — Rih Khaw Dar and Tamu.; e-Visa is available for tourism only.
Namibia	eVisa / Visa on arrival	3 months / 90 days	Available at Hosea Kutako International Airport.
Nauru	Visa required		Visas are issued with validity of 30 days.; Visa can be obtained in the Nauruan Press Office at the United Nations.
Nepal	Online Visa / Visa on arrival	90 days	
Netherlands	Visa not required	90 days	90 days within any 180 day period in the Schengen Area.
New Zealand	Electronic Travel Authority	3 months	International Visitor Conservation and Tourism Levy must be paid upon requesting an Electronic Travel Authority.; Holders of an Australian Permanent Resident Visa or Resident Return Visa may be granted a New Zealand Resident Visa on arrival permitting indefinite stay (pursuant to the Trans-Tasman Travel Arrangement), subject to meeting character requirements and obtaining an Electronic Travel Authority prior to departure. Such travellers are not required to pay the International Visitor Conservation and Tourism Levy.
Nicaragua	Visa not required	90 days	Tourist card must be purchased upon arrival.
Niger	Visa required		International Certificate of Vaccination or Prophylaxis required.
Nigeria	eVisa	30 days	Business eVisas-on-arrival available for "Frequently Traveled Business Persons of International Reputes" or "Executives of Multi-national Companies", as well as for government officials; International Certificate of Vaccination or Prophylaxis required if arriving from a country with a risk of yellow fever transmission.
North Macedonia	Visa not required	90 days	90 days within any 180 day period.; Registration with the local police within 24 hours of arrival is mandatory.
Norway	Visa not required	90 days	90 days within any 180 day period in the Schengen Area.
Oman	Visa not required / eVisa	14 days / 30 days	Visa exemption valid for 10 days; Holders of a visa or entrance stamp of the Emirate of Dubai that is valid for at least 21 days are visa exempt.; Holders of a visa for Qatar that is valid for travel to Oman and valid for at least one month are visa exempt when arriving directly from Qatar.
Pakistan	eVisa	3 months	
Palau	Free visa on arrival	30 days	
Panama	Visa not required	90 days	Denial of entry or transit to any person who has a criminal conviction.
Papua New Guinea	eVisa	60 days	Available at Gurney Airport (Alotau), Mount Hagen Airport, Port Moresby Airport and Tokua Airport (Rabaul).
Paraguay	Visa not required	90 days	National ID card accepted.; Chileans can live and work legally in Paraguay under the Mercosur (and Associated Members) immigration agreement with no requirement other than being a citizen at birth or a naturalized citizen for over 5 years, and passing a background check.
Peru	Visa not required	up to 183 days	National ID card accepted.; Chileans can live and work legally in Peru under the Mercosur (and Associated Members) immigration agreement with no requirement other than being a citizen at birth or a naturalized citizen for over 5 years, and passing a background check.
Philippines	Visa not required	30 days	
Poland	Visa not required	90 days	90 days within any 180 day period in the Schengen Area.; Dual nationals must use their Polish passport.
Portugal	Visa not required	90 days	90 days within any 180 day period in the Schengen Area.
Qatar	Visa not required	30 days	
Romania	Visa not required	90 days	90 days within any 180 day period in the Schengen Area.
Russia	Visa not required	90 days	90 days within any 180 day period.
Rwanda	eVisa / Visa on arrival	30 days	Visitors are fingerprinted.; International Certificate of Vaccination or Prophylaxis required only if arriving from high risk countries as defined by WHO.
Saint Kitts and Nevis	Visa not required	3 months	
Saint Lucia	Visa not required	6 weeks	
Saint Vincent and the Grenadines	Visa not required	3 months	
Samoa	Entry permit on arrival	90 days	
San Marino	Visa not required		
São Tomé and Príncipe	eVisa		International Certificate of Vaccination or Prophylaxis required.
Saudi Arabia	Visa required		Residents of GCC countries can apply for Saudi e-Visas online and residents of the United States, United Kingdom and European Union may apply for a visa on arrival
Senegal	Visa required		International Certificate of Vaccination or Prophylaxis required.
Serbia	Visa not required	90 days	90 days within any 180 day period.
Seychelles	Electronic Border System	3 months	Application can be submitted up to 30 days before travel.; Visitors must upload a reservation confirmation(s) for each visitor's location of stay in Seychelles.; Yellow fever vaccination certificate is required if coming from endemic countries.; Payment of the fee (EUR 10) by credit or debit card.; Valid for one journey only and it expires once exit the country.
Sierra Leone	eVisa	3 months	International Certificate of Vaccination or Prophylaxis required.
Singapore	Visa not required	30 days	All visitors are fingerprinted upon arrival and departure
Slovakia	Visa not required	90 days	90 days within any 180 day period in the Schengen Area.
Slovenia	Visa not required	90 days	90 days within any 180 day period in the Schengen Area.
Solomon Islands	Free Visitor's permit on arrival	3 months	3 months within 12 months.; Visitors visa issued upon arrival for free.
Somalia	eVisa	30 days	
South Africa	Visa not required	90 days	Holders of passports without 2 blank pages may be refused entry.
South Sudan	eVisa		Obtainable online 30 days single entry for 100 USD, 90 days multiple entry for 200 USD and 180 days multiple entry for 350 USD.; Printed visa authorization must be presented at the time of travel.
Spain	Visa not required	90 days	90 days within any 180 day period in the Schengen Area.
Sri Lanka	ETA / Visa on arrival	30 days	
Sudan	Visa required		If arriving from a country of high yellow fever risk and stayed for more than 12 hours, then Yellow Fever vaccine required.; Exit visa required.; Registration within 3 days mandatory.
Suriname	Visa not required	90 days	An entrance fee of USD 50 or EUR 50 must be paid online prior to arrival.; Multiple entry e-Visa is also available.
Sweden	Visa not required	90 days	90 days within any 180 day period in the Schengen Area.
Switzerland	Visa not required	90 days	90 days within any 180 day period in the Schengen Area.
Syria	eVisa		Registration required within 15 days.; Persons with passports bearing Israeli visas or entry/exit stamps are not allowed to enter.; Visa not required for foreign citizens with proof of Syrian origin, such as an identification card or passport.; Dual-citizen males ages 17–42 need military service book.; If not forgiven by the military, dual-citizens may apply for a visit visa once a year through the embassy.
Tajikistan	Visa not required / eVisa	30 days / 60 days	e-Visa holders can enter through all border points.
Tanzania	eVisa / Visa on arrival	90 days	
Thailand	Visa not required	90 days	
Timor-Leste	Visa on arrival	30 days	Not available at all entry points.; For arrivals by air only
Togo	eVisa	15 days	
Tonga	Visa required		
Trinidad and Tobago	Visa not required	90 days	
Tunisia	Visa not required	90 days	
Turkey	Visa not required	90 days	
Turkmenistan	Visa required		10-day visa on arrival if holding a letter of invitation provided by a company registered in Turkmenistan with a prior approval from the Foreign Ministry. Visitors can apply to extend their stay for an additional 10 days.; When transiting between two non-bordering countries, visitors can obtain a Turkmenistan transit visa for a five-day stay. This must be applied for in advance at the Turkmenistan Embassy. Visitors must also submit copies of the visas for the country of entry into Turkmenistan and the country of departure from Turkmenistan. Visa fee is 20 USD.
Tuvalu	Visa on arrival	90 days	
Uganda	eVisa	3 months	Determined at the port of entry.; Must apply online at least 2 business days prior to travel.; Airlines may deny passengers permission to board flights to Uganda without proof that they had successfully applied for an e-Visa.; Ugandan immigration authorities may require additional documentation, including proof of a return plane ticket and detailed tour itinerary in Uganda.; International Certificate of Vaccination or Prophylaxis required.
Ukraine	Visa not required	90 days	90 days within any 180 day period.
United Arab Emirates	Visa not required	90 days	
United Kingdom	Electronic Travel Authorisation	6 months	Up to 90 days if arriving from Ireland (Common Travel Area).
United States	Visa Waiver Program	90 days	ESTA is valid for 2 years from the date of issuance.; ESTA is also required when entering the country by cruise ship or land.; A Form I-94 is required for entry into the United States by land. It carries a $30 fee and can be obtained either online or upon arrival.; Visa required for nationals of VWP countries who have travelled or been present in Iran, Iraq, Libya, North Korea, Somalia, Sudan, Syria or Yemen at any time on or after 1 March 2011 or Cuba at any time on or after 12 January 2021, or nationals of VWP countries who are also nationals of Iran, Iraq, North Korea, Sudan or Syria. Exceptions apply if the travel was in military or diplomatic service of the VWP country.
Uruguay	Visa not required	3 months	National ID card accepted.; Chileans can live and work legally in Uruguay under the Mercosur (and Associated Members) immigration agreement with no requirement other than being a citizen at birth or a naturalized citizen for over 5 years, and passing a background check.
Uzbekistan	Visa not required	30 days	
Vanuatu	Visa not required	120 days	
Vatican City	Visa not required		Open borders but de facto follows Italian visa policy.; No foreign accommodations, residency restricted to Vatican citizens only.
Venezuela	eVisa		Registration mandatory.; Introduction of Electronic Visa System for Tourist and Business Travelers.
Vietnam	Visa not required	90 days	e-Visa is valid for 90 days and multiple entry.; Phú Quốc visa exemption for up to 30 days.
Yemen	Visa required		Exit visa required for stays over 30 days.; Yemen introduced an e-Visa system for visitors who meet certain eligibility requirements (group travel of 10 or more people, business trips, and transit etc.).
Zambia	eVisa / Visa on arrival	90 days	Also eligible for a universal visa allowing access to Zimbabwe.; International Certificate of Vaccination or Prophylaxis required only travelers arriving from certain places as defined by Govertment. Please check the WHO 2020 Yellow Fever vaccination requirements document for exact list.
Zimbabwe	eVisa / Visa on arrival	1 month	Also eligible for a universal visa allowing access to Zambia.; Tourism purposes only.

=== Territories or administrative subdivisions with different visa policies ===
Visa requirements for Chilean citizens for visits to various territories, disputed areas, partially recognized countries not mentioned in the list above, recognized administrative subdivisions that operate on different visa policies and restricted zones:

Visitor to	Visa requirement	Allowed stay	Notes (excluding departure fees)
Africa
Eritrea outside Asmara	Travel permit required		Travel Permit for Foreigners is required to travel outside of the capital.
Ascension Island	eVisa	3 months	3 months within any 1-year period.
Saint Helena	Visa not required		Visitor's Pass granted on arrival.
Tristan da Cunha	Permission required		Permission to land required for 15/30 pounds sterling (yacht/ship passenger) for Tristan da Cunha Island; 20 pounds sterling for Gough Island, Inaccessible Island or Nightingale Islands.
Mayotte	Visa not required	90 days	
Sahrawi Arab Democratic Republic	Visa regime undefined		Undefined visa regime in the Western Sahara, same entry requirements with Morocco, controlled territory.
Somaliland	Visa required		
Réunion	Visa not required	90 days	
Sudan outside Khartoum	Travel permit required		All foreigners traveling more than 25 kilometers outside of Khartoum must obtain a travel permit.
(Sudan) Darfur	Travel permit required		Separate travel permit is required.
Asia
British Indian Ocean Territory	Special permit required		Special permit required.
(China) Hainan	Visa not required	30 days	
Hong Kong	Visa not required	90 days	
Protected and restricted areas of India	PAP/RAP required		Protected Area Permit (PAP) required for whole states of Nagaland and Sikkim and parts of states Manipur, Arunachal Pradesh, Uttaranchal, Jammu and Kashmir, Rajasthan, Himachal Pradesh.; Restricted Area Permit (RAP) required for all of Andaman and Nicobar Islands and parts of Sikkim.; Some of these requirements are occasionally lifted for a year.
Iraqi Kurdistan	Visa required		
(Kazakhstan) Baikonur & Priozersk	Special permission required		Special permission required for the city of Baikonur and surrounding areas in Kyzylorda Oblast, and the town of Priozersk near Almaty.
(Iran) Kish Island	Visa not required	14 days	Tourists for Kish Island do not require a visa.
Macau	Visa not required	30 days	
(Malaysia) Sabah and Sarawak	Visa not required		These states have their own immigration authorities and a passport is required to travel to them, but the same visa applies.
Maldives outside Malé	Permission required		Tourists are generally prohibited from visiting non-resort islands without the express permission of the Government of the Maldives.
Palestine	Visa not required		Travel to Gaza Strip may be restricted .
Taiwan	Visa not required	90 days	
(Tajikistan) Gorno-Badakhshan Autonomous Province	OIVR permit required		OIVR permit required.; Special permit required for Lake Sarez.
(China) Tibet Autonomous Region	TTP required		Tibet Travel Permit required in addition to Chinese visa.
(Saudi Arabia) Mecca and Medina	Special access required		Non-Muslims and those following the Ahmadiyya religious movement are strictly prohibited from entry.
Closed cities of Turkmenistan	Special permit required		A special permit, issued prior to arrival by Ministry of Foreign Affairs, is required if visiting the following places: Atamurat, Cheleken, Dashoguz, Serakhs and Serhetabat.
(Vietnam) Phú Quốc	Visa not required	30 days	
Yemen outside Sanaa or Aden	Special permission required		Special permission needed for travel outside Sanaa or Aden.
Caribbean and North Atlantic
Åland Islands	Visa not required	3 months	
Anguilla	Visa not required	3 months	
Aruba	Visa not required	30 days	
Bermuda	Visa not required	6 months	
(Caribbean Netherlands) (Bonaire, St. Eustatius and Saba)	Visa not required	180 days	
British Virgin Islands	Visa not required	30 days	
Cayman Islands	Visa not required	6 months	
(Colombia) San Andrés and Leticia	Tourist Card on arrival		Visitors arriving at Gustavo Rojas Pinilla International Airport and Alfredo Vásquez Cobo International Airport must buy tourist cards on arrival.
Curaçao	Visa not required	6 months	Maximum consecutive period of six months each calendar year.
(France) French West Indies (Martinique, Guadeloupe, Saint Martin and Saint Barthélemy)	Visa not required	3 months	
Greenland	Visa not required		
Montserrat	Visa not required	6 months	
Puerto Rico	Electronic System for Travel Authorization	90 days	Visa not required under the Visa Waiver Program, for 90 days on arrival from overseas for 2 years. ESTA required.
Sint Maarten	Visa not required	6 months	Maximum stay allowed is 6 months uninterrupted with the possibility to extend
Turks and Caicos Islands	Visa not required	90 days	
(United States Virgin Islands) U.S. Virgin Islands	Electronic System for Travel Authorization	90 days	Visa not required under the Visa Waiver Program, for 90 days on arrival from overseas for 2 years. ESTA required.
Europe
Abkhazia	Visa required		Tourists from all countries (except Georgia) can visit Abkhazia for a period not exceeding 24 hours as part of an organized tourist group.
(Belarus) Brest and Grodno	Visa not required	10 days	
Crimea	Visa not required		Russian visa policy applies.
Novorossiya	Restricted area		Crossing from Ukraine requires visit purpose to be explained to Ukrainian passport control on exit and those who entered from Russia are not allowed to proceed further into Ukraine.
Northern Cyprus	Visa not required	3 months	
Faroe Islands	Visa not required		
Gibraltar	Visa not required		
Guernsey	Visa not required		
Isle of Man	Visa not required		
(Norway) Jan Mayen	Permit required	24 hours	Permit issued by the local police required for stays less than 24 hours; Permit issued by the Norwegian police required for stays of more than 24 hours.
Jersey	Visa not required		
Closed cities of Russia	Special authorization required		Several closed cities and regions in Russia require special authorization.
South Ossetia	Visa required		To enter South Ossetia, visitors must have a multiple-entry visa for Russia and register their stay with the Migration Service of the Ministry of Internal Affairs within 3 days.
Svalbard	Visa not required	Unlimited	Anyone of any nationality may live and work freely in Svalbard per the Svalbard Treaty.
Transnistria	Visa not required	24 hours	Registration required after 24h.
Oceania
American Samoa	Electronic authorization	30 days	
(Australia) Ashmore and Cartier Islands	Special authorisation required		Special authorisation required.
(France) Clipperton Island	Special permit required		Special permit required.
Cook Islands	Visa not required	31 days	
(Fiji) Lau Province	Special permission required		Special permission required.
French Polynesia	Visa not required	90 days	90 days within any 180-day period.
Guam	Electronic System for Travel Authorization	90 days	Visa not required under the Visa Waiver Program ESTA required.
Niue	Visa not required	30 days	
New Caledonia	Visa not required	90 days	90 days within any 180-day period
Northern Mariana Islands	Electronic System for Travel Authorization	90 days	Visa not required under the Visa Waiver Program ESTA required.
Pitcairn Islands	Visa not required	14 days	
Tokelau	Entry permit required		
South America
(Argentina) (Misiones Province) Isla Apipé and Isla del medio	Visa not required	90 days	By being Argentine territories, the same visa policy applies.
Galápagos	Pre-registration required	60 days	60 days; Visitors must pre-register to receive a 20 USD Transit Control Card (TCT).
(France) French Guiana	Visa not required	3 months	International Certificate of Vaccination required.
South Atlantic and Antarctica
Falkland Islands	Visa not required	1 month	A visitor permit is normally issued as a stamp in the passport on arrival, The maximum validity period is 1 month.
South Georgia and the South Sandwich Islands	Permit required		Pre-arrival permit from the Commissioner required (72 hours/1 month for 110/160 pounds sterling).
Antarctica	Special permits required		Special permits required for Bouvet Island, British Antarctic Territory, French Southern and Antarctic Lands, Argentine Antarctica, (Australia) Australian Antarctic Territory, (Antártica Chilena Province) Chilean Antarctic Territory, (Australia) Heard Island and McDonald Islands, (Norway) Peter I Island, (Norway) Queen Maud Land, (New Zealand) Ross Dependency.

== Pre-approved visas pick-up ==
Pre-approved visas can be picked up on arrival in the following countries instead in embassy or consulate.

Pre-approved visas pick-up on arrival	Conditions
Bhutan	For a maximum stay of 15 days if the application was submitted at least 2 and a half months before arrival and if the clearance was obtained.
Cameroon	Must hold approval from the General Delegate of Security.
Eritrea	Must have a sponsor who must submit an application at least 48 hours before arrival.
Liberia	Available only if arriving from a country without a diplomatic mission of Liberia and if a sponsor obtained an approval.
Nigeria	Holders of a visa application who have a Nigerian company taking responsibility for them.
Sudan	Holders of an entry permit issued by the Ministry of Interior.
Turkmenistan	Holders of an invitation letter of the local company that was approved by the Ministry of Foreign Affairs.

== APEC Business Travel Card ==
Full members of the scheme Transitional members (United States, Canada)

Holders of an APEC Business Travel Card (ABTC) travelling on business do not require a visa to the following countries:

- Australia^{2}
- Brunei^{2}
- China^{4}
- Hong Kong^{4}
- Indonesia^{4}
- Japan^{2}
- Malaysia^{2}
- Mexico^{1}
- New Zealand^{2}
- Papua New Guinea^{4}
- Peru^{2}
- Philippines^{4}
- Russia^{3}
- Singapore^{4}
- South Korea^{2}
- Taiwan^{2}
- Thailand^{2}
- Vietnam^{4}

_{1 - Up to 180 days}
_{2 - Up to 90 days}
_{3 - Up to 90 days in a period of 180 days}
_{4 - Up to 60 days}

The card must be used in conjunction with a passport and has the following advantages:

- No need to apply for a visa or entry permit to APEC countries, as the card is treated as such (except by Canada and United States)
- Undertake legitimate business in participating economies
- Expedited border crossing in all member economies, including transitional members

== Non-visa restrictions ==
=== Blank passport pages ===
Many countries require a minimum number of blank pages to be available in the passport being presented, typically one or two pages. Endorsement pages, which often appear after the visa pages, are not counted as being valid or available.

=== Vaccination ===
Cover of the new International Certificate of Vaccination issued by the Bureau of Quarantine in the Philippines since 2021

The African countries of Angola, Benin, Burkina Faso, Burundi, Cameroon, Central African Republic, Democratic Republic of the Congo, Republic of the Congo, Côte d'Ivoire, Gabon, Ghana, Guinea-Bissau, Mali, Niger, Sierra Leone and Togo, South Sudan and Uganda, along with French Guiana in South America, require all incoming passengers older than nine months to one year, to have a current International Certificate of Vaccination or Prophylaxis.

Some other countries require vaccination only if the passenger is coming from an infected area or has visited one recently or has transited for 12 hours in those countries: Algeria, Botswana, Cabo Verde, Chad, Djibouti, Egypt, Eswatini, Ethiopia, Gambia, Ghana, Guinea, Lesotho, Libya, Equatorial Guinea, Eritrea, Madagascar, Malawi, Mauritania, Mauritius, Mozambique, Namibia, Nigeria, Papua New Guinea, Seychelles, Somalia, South Africa, Sudan, Tunisia, Uganda, Tanzania, Zambia and Zimbabwe.

=== Passport validity length ===
Very few countries, such as Paraguay, just require a valid passport on arrival.

However many countries and groupings now require only an identity card – especially from their neighbours. Other countries may have special bilateral arrangements that depart from the generality of their passport validity length policies to shorten the period of passport validity required for each other's citizens or even accept passports that have already expired (but not been cancelled).

Some countries, such as Japan, Ireland and the United Kingdom, require a passport valid throughout the period of the intended stay.

In the absence of specific bilateral agreements, countries requiring passports to be valid for at least 6 more months on arrival include Afghanistan, Algeria, Anguilla, Bahrain, Bhutan, Botswana, British Virgin Islands, Brunei, Cambodia, Cameroon, Cape Verde, Cayman Islands, Central African Republic, Chad, Comoros, Costa Rica, Côte d'Ivoire, Curaçao, Ecuador, Egypt, El Salvador, Equatorial Guinea, Fiji, Gabon, Guinea Bissau, Guyana, Haiti, India, Indonesia, Iran, Iraq, Israel, Jordan, Kenya, Kiribati, Kuwait, Laos, Madagascar, Malaysia, Marshall Islands, Mongolia, Myanmar, Namibia, Nepal, Nicaragua, Nigeria, Oman, Palau, Papua New Guinea, Peru, Philippines, Qatar, Rwanda, Samoa, Saudi Arabia, Singapore, Solomon Islands, Somalia, Sri Lanka, Sudan, Suriname, Tanzania, Thailand, Timor-Leste, Tokelau, Tonga, Turkey, Tuvalu, Uganda, United Arab Emirates, Vanuatu, Venezuela, and Vietnam.

Countries requiring passports valid for at least 4 months on arrival include Micronesia and Zambia.

Countries requiring passports with a validity of at least 3 months beyond the date of intended departure include Azerbaijan, Bosnia and Herzegovina, Honduras, Montenegro, Nauru, Moldova and New Zealand. Similarly, the EEA countries of Iceland, Liechtenstein, Norway, all European Union countries (except Ireland) together with Switzerland also require 3 months validity beyond the date of the bearer's intended departure unless the bearer is an EEA or Swiss national.

Countries requiring passports valid for at least 3 months on arrival include Albania, North Macedonia, Panama, and Senegal.

Bermuda requires passports to be valid for at least 45 days upon entry.

Countries that require a passport validity of at least one month beyond the date of intended departure include Eritrea, Hong Kong, Lebanon, Macau, the Maldives and South Africa.

==== Maximum passport age ====
Countries of the Schengen area require non-EU passports to be less than 10 years old upon entry.

=== Criminal record ===
Some countries, including Australia, Canada, Fiji, New Zealand and the United States, routinely deny entry to non-citizens who have a criminal record, while others impose restrictions depending on the type of conviction and the length of the sentence.

=== Persona non grata ===
The government of a country can declare a diplomat persona non grata, banning them from entering the country or expelling them if they have already entered. In non-diplomatic use, the authorities of a country may also declare a foreigner persona non grata permanently or temporarily, usually because of unlawful activity.

=== Israeli stamps ===
Kuwait, Lebanon, Libya, and Yemen do not allow entry to people with passport stamps from Israel or whose passports have either a used or an unused Israeli visa, or where there is evidence of previous travel to Israel such as entry or exit stamps from neighbouring border posts in transit countries such as Jordan and Egypt.

To circumvent this Arab League boycott of Israel, the Israeli immigration services have now mostly ceased to stamp foreign nationals' passports on either entry to or exit from Israel (unless the entry is for some work-related purposes). Since 15 January 2013, Israel no longer stamps foreign passports at Ben Gurion Airport. Passports are still (as of 22 June 2017) stamped at Erez when passing into and out of Gaza.

Iran refuses admission to holders of passports containing an Israeli visa or stamp that is less than 12 months old.

=== Biometrics ===
Several countries mandate that all travellers, or all foreign travellers, be fingerprinted on arrival and will refuse admission to or even arrest travellers who refuse to comply. In some countries, such as the United States, this may apply even to transit passengers who merely wish to change planes rather than go landside.

Fingerprinting countries/regions include Afghanistan, Argentina, Brunei, Cambodia, China, Ethiopia, Ghana, Guinea, India, Japan, Kenya (both fingerprints and a photo are taken), Malaysia upon entry and departure, Mongolia, Saudi Arabia, the Schengen Area, Singapore, South Korea, Taiwan, Thailand, Uganda, the United Arab Emirates and the United States.

Many countries also require a photo be taken of people entering the country. The United States, which does not fully implement exit control formalities at its land frontiers (although long mandated by its own legislation), intends to implement facial recognition for passengers departing from international airports to identify people who overstay their visa.

Together with fingerprint and face recognition, iris scanning is one of three biometric identification technologies internationally standardised since 2006 by the International Civil Aviation Organization (ICAO) for use in e-passports and the United Arab Emirates conducts iris scanning on visitors who need to apply for a visa. The United States Department of Homeland Security has announced plans to greatly increase the biometric data it collects at US borders. In 2018, Singapore began trials of iris scanning at three land and maritime immigration checkpoints.

== See also ==
- Visa policy of Chile
- Chilean passport
