= Chilean passport =

Travel document

Chilean passport; Pasaporte chileno
- Front cover of a contemporary Chilean biometric passport.
- Type: Passport
- Issued by: Chile
- First issued: September 2013 (biometric passport); 16 December 2024 (new version)
- Purpose: Identification
- Eligibility: Chilean citizenship
- Expiration: 10 years from issuance for all citizens regardless of age
- Cost: 32 page passport: CLP $69.660; 64 page passport: CLP $69.740

Chilean passport (Spanish: Pasaporte chileno) is an identity document issued to citizens of Chile to facilitate international travel. Chilean passports are valid for worldwide travel and facilitate the access to consular services whilst abroad. They are issued by the Registro Civil e Identificación.

Citizens of Chile do not need a passport when traveling to Argentina, Bolivia, Brazil, Colombia, Ecuador, Paraguay, Peru and Uruguay. For these countries, they may use just their National ID cards called Cédula de Identidad.

Chilean passports are valid for a period of 10 years (since 1 February 2020) from the date of issue, and the validity may not be extended. Since the introduction of machine-readable passports, family passports are no longer issued.

Since September 2013, only biometric passports are issued. The redesign was part of a program organized by the Ministry of Justice, where Chileans chose the passport's graphic identity and symbols through an online poll in 2012.

== Application process ==
All passports are issued exclusively by the Registro Civil e Identificación. Within Chile, passport applications are made in person at most offices of the Registro Civil e Identificación. For applicants outside Chile, applications are accepted by all Consulate Generals. A photograph and fingerprints of the applicant are taken on site, as well as a fingerprint of the right thumb if the applicant also requires an Identity Card, Cédula de Identidad.

Passports applications in Chile have a turn-around time of 7 labour days (but usually is not more than 3 labour days from photo capture to delivery) and must be picked up at the office where the application was made, unless the applicant requires the passport to be delivered for pick-up in Santiago or in another different office. The expected time of delivery for passport applications made outside Chile is of about 6 weeks, unless the applicant requires an expedite service for an additional cost (subject to availability).

== Physical description ==
- 2024–present edition

The regular passport design will revert back to a blue colored cover (similar to the 2013 series Chilean Official Passport cover color), and along with 70 new security measures being introduced, the back cover will also incorporate an image of a moai statue.

- 2013–2024 edition (still valid, until expiration dates in each passport)

Regular biometric passports issued since September 2013 (until the introduction of the new type in December 2024) are burgundy red colored. The words República de Chile are above the coat of arms with the word Pasaporte and Passport below, followed by the biometric passport symbol. Both the letters and coat of arms are color gold. The standard passport has 32 pages, while the extended version has 64 for an additional fee. The data page contains a microchip with the biometric information of the holder. It features images of the Andes, the Andean Condor and the national flag. The passport is in Spanish and English.

- 1992–2013 edition

Regular passports are deep navy blue. The words República de Chile are above the Chilean Coat of Arms, with the word Pasaporte below. The color of the coat of arms and the letters is copper. The standard passport contains 32 pages, but it can be issued with 64 pages for an additional fee. The data page is located in the back cover, therefore leaving all 32 pages for stamps and visas. The data page has several security features, such as the digitalized photograph and signature of the bearer, as coat of arms visible under ultraviolet light and a Moai printed with optically variable ink over the upper-left corner of the bearer's photograph.

Since 2003, only machine-readable passports with a digitalized photo of the passport holder are issued. The information page is written in Spanish and English.

- Photograph
- Type of Document (P for Passport, D for Diplomatic and O for Official)
- Country Code (CHL)
- Passport Number (same as RUN number (National ID) until 2013)
- Surname
- Given Names
- Nationality (Chilena)
- Booklet Number
- Date of Birth
- Issuing Authority (Registro Civil e Identificación)
- Gender
- Place of Birth (Name of city if born in Chile. For those born outside Chile, name of the city and the country)
- Issuing date
- Expiration date
- Signature

The information page ends with the machine-readable zone.

== Fees ==
Passport applications for a 32-page booklet within the country at the Civil Registry and Identification Service of Chile cost $69,660 pesos (around US$90) and for a 64-page booklet the cost is $69,740 pesos.

Passport applications for a passport outside Chile are similarly priced but paid in the local currency. The price is informed to the applicant by the consular office at the time of application and a US$3 consular fee is added. e.g.

These costs may vary in accordance with rises determined annually by the Civil Registry & Identification Service.

== Biometric passport ==
The Registro Civil e Identificación and the Ministry of Justice of Chile awarded the contract to manufacture new Chilean biometric passports and ID cards to France-based Morpho S.A.S (now IDEMIA) on 20 January 2012. The new passport and ID card system was introduced to the general public on 2 September 2013. All documents issued from this date on will be biometric, and all non-biometric documents will be valid until their date of expiration.

== Gallery of Chilean passports ==
Regular passports

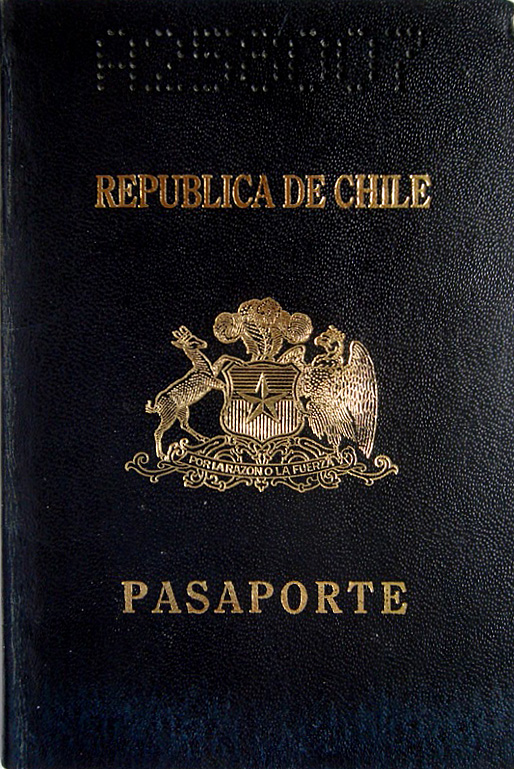
Regular passport (1992-2013)

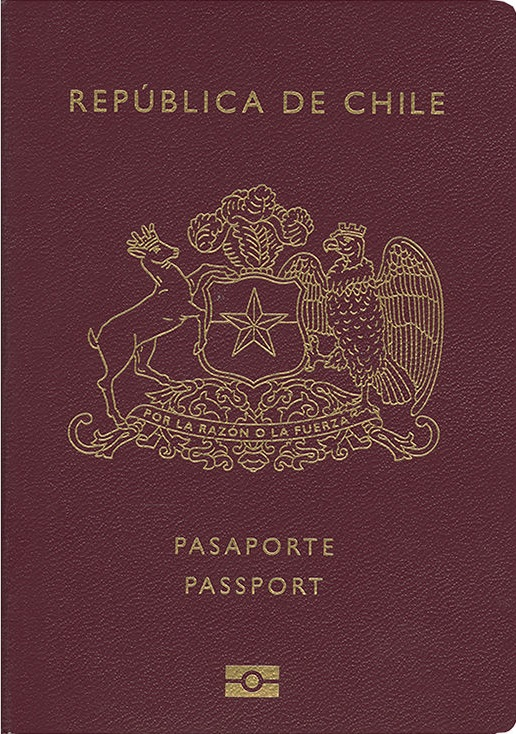
Regular passport (2013-2024)

Official passports

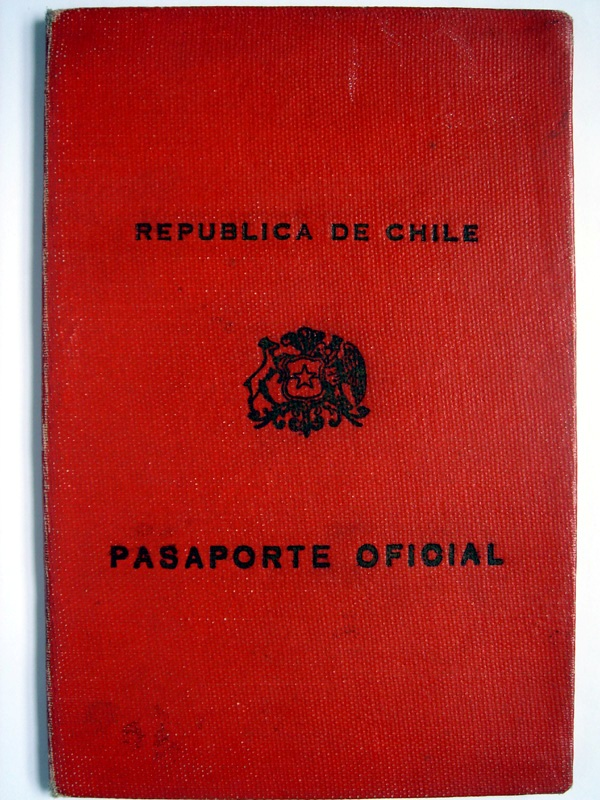
Official passport (issued in 1957)

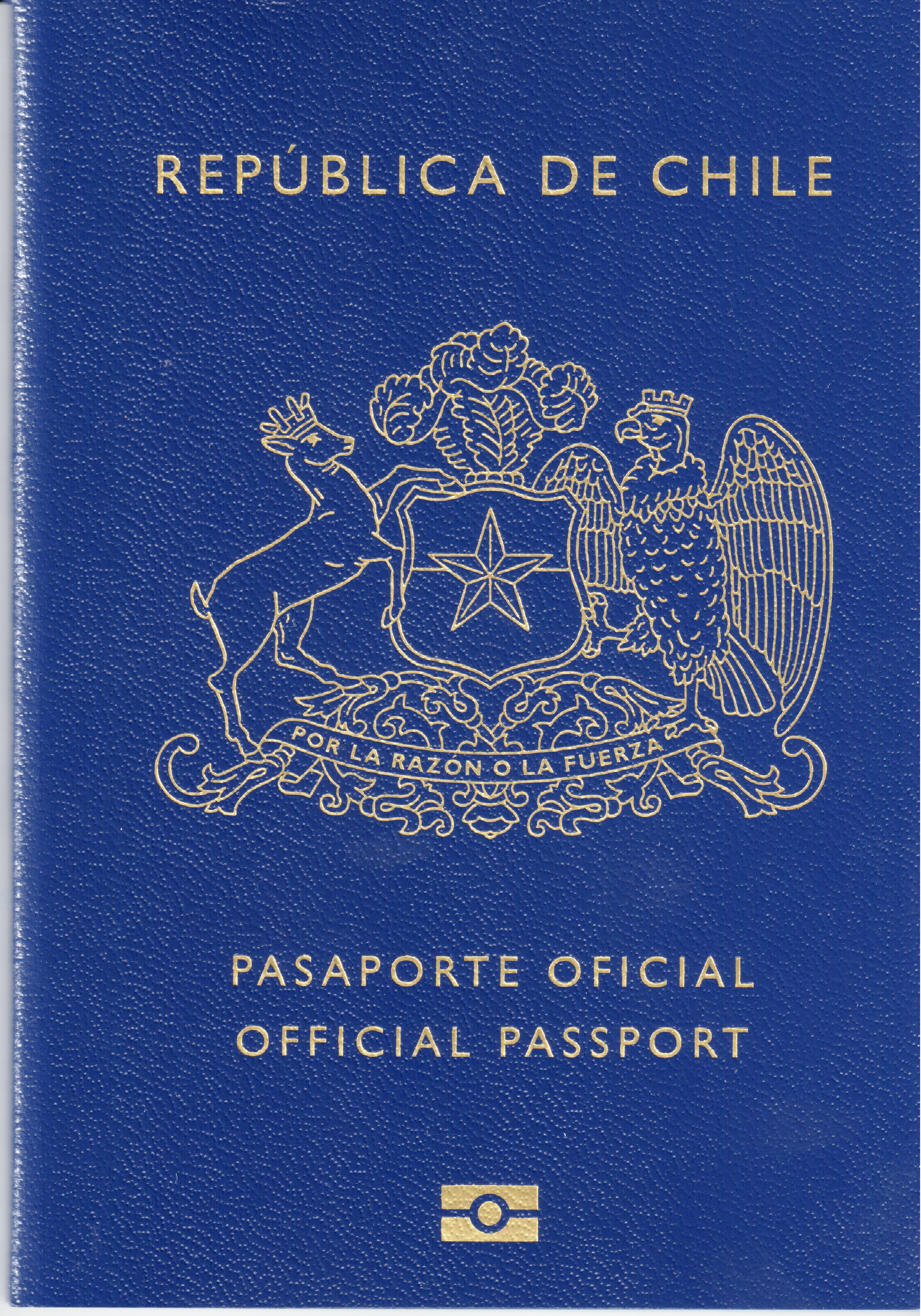
Official passport (2013-2024)

Diplomatic passports

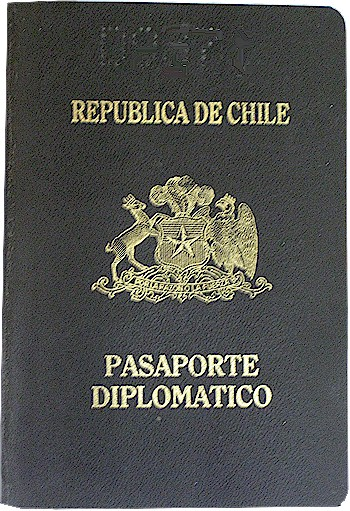
Diplomatic passport (until 2005)

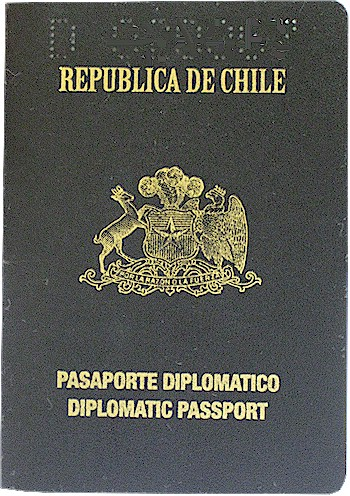
Diplomatic passport (2005–2013)

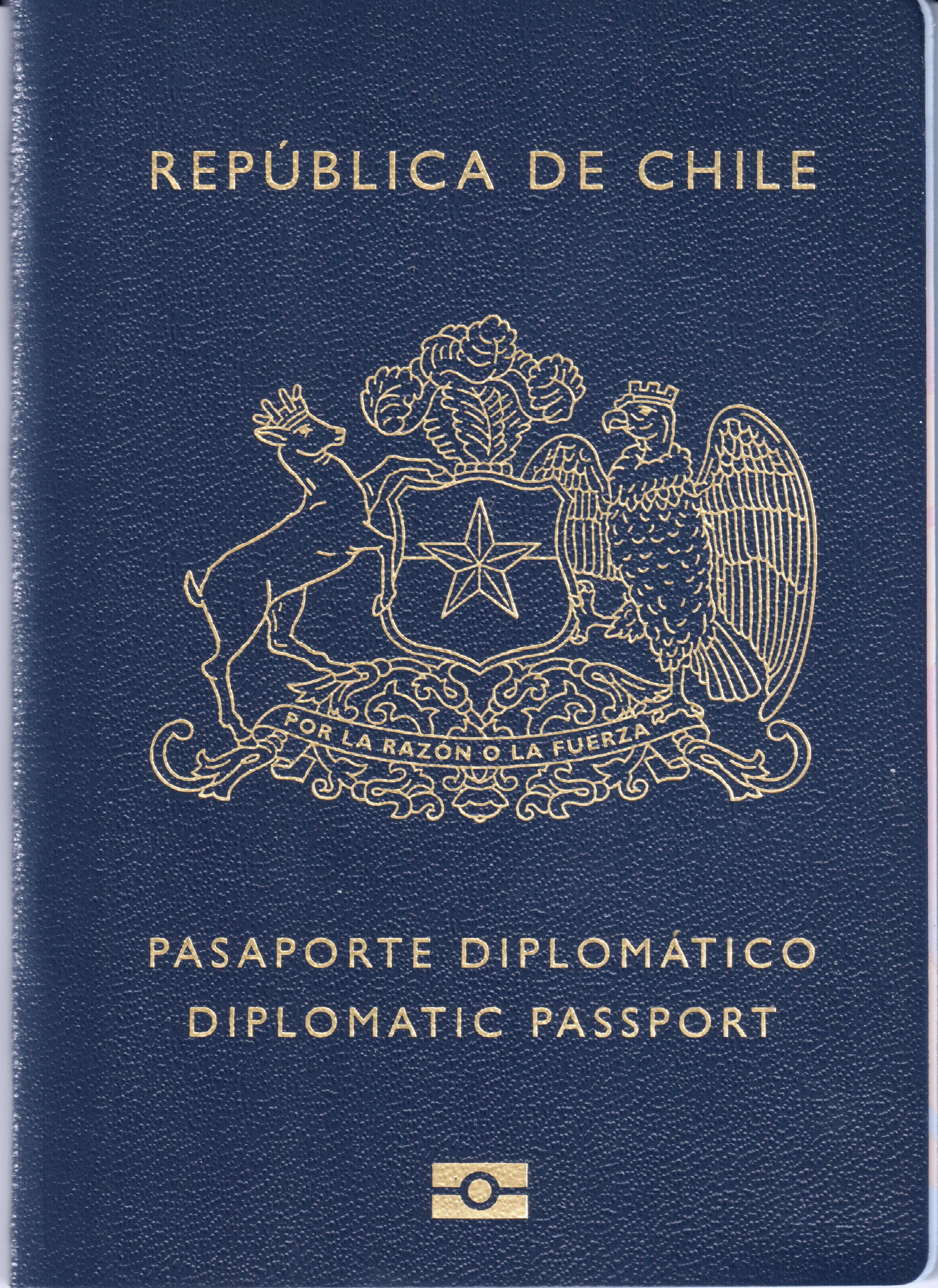
Diplomatic passport (2013-2024)

== Visa requirements ==
Visa requirements for holders of Chilean passport

Chile
ID card travel
Visa free
Visa on arrival
eVisa
Visa available both on arrival or online
Visa required

As of April 2025, Chilean citizens had visa-free or visa on arrival access to 175 countries and territories, ranking the Chilean passport 14th in the world in terms of travel freedom, the third strongest in the Americas (after the passports of the United States and Canada), and the strongest in Latin America, according to the Henley Passport Index.
