= Visa policy of Chile =

Policy on permits required to enter Chile

Visitors to Chile must obtain a visa from one of the Chilean diplomatic missions unless they are citizens from one of the visa-exempt countries.

Chile generally maintains a reciprocal visa policy with other countries.

== Visa policy map ==
Visa policy of Chile Chile Visa not required - may enter with an ID card (90 days) Visa not required (90 days) Visa not required (30 days) Visa not required (90 days) if holding a valid Canadian or US visa; otherwise, visa required Visa required

== Visa exemption ==
=== Ordinary passports ===
Citizens of the following countries and territories may enter Chile without a visa for the following period:

90 days

- All European Union member states

- Albania
- Andorra
- Antigua and Barbuda
- Argentina^{ID}
- Australia
- Bahamas
- Barbados
- Belize
- Bolivia^{ID}
- Bosnia and Herzegovina
- Brazil^{ID}
- Canada
- Colombia^{ID}
- Costa Rica
- Ecuador^{ID}
- El Salvador
- Fiji
- Georgia
- Grenada
- Guatemala
- Guyana
- Honduras
- Hong Kong
- Iceland
- Israel
- Jamaica
- Japan
- Liechtenstein
- Mauritius
- Mexico
- Moldova
- Monaco
- Mongolia
- Montenegro
- New Zealand
- Nicaragua
- North Macedonia
- Norway
- Panama
- Paraguay^{ID}
- Peru^{ID}
- Russia
- Saint Kitts and Nevis
- Saint Lucia
- Saint Vincent and the Grenadines
- San Marino
- Serbia
- South Africa
- South Korea
- Suriname
- Switzerland
- Taiwan
- Thailand
- Tonga
- Trinidad and Tobago
- Turkey
- Ukraine
- United Arab Emirates
- United Kingdom
- United States
- Uruguay^{ID}
- Vatican City
- Vietnam

30 days

- Indonesia
- Macau
- Malaysia
- Singapore

_{ID - May enter with an ID card in lieu of a passport.}

Date of visa changes
- 14 November 1947: Argentina
- 1 January 1949: Switzerland
- 15 April 1953: Norway
- 2 November 1954: Netherlands
- 1 December 1956: Belgium
- 18 September 1966: Ecuador
- 15 November 1969: Japan
- May 1973: Yugoslavia (applies today to Bosnia and Herzegovina, Croatia, North Macedonia, Montenegro, Serbia and Slovenia)
- 24 December 1994: France
- 18 January 2011: Russia
- 21 October 2015: Ukraine
- 1 January 2016: Taiwan
- 11 August 2017: Vietnam
- 16 December 2017: United Arab Emirates
- 29 December 2018: Mongolia
- 20 May 2022: Suriname
- 17 September 2025: Australia

Cancelled:

- 23 April 2018: Haiti
- 22 June 2019: Venezuela

==== Substitute visa ====
Citizens of China who hold a valid visa issued by Canada or the United States, with a validity of at least 6 months, may enter Chile without a visa for up to 90 days. This does not apply to passengers with US "C" visas.

Citizens of India and the Dominican Republic who hold a valid visa issued by the United States, with a validity of at least 6 months, may enter Chile without a visa for up to 90 days. This does not apply to passengers with "C" visas.

Citizens of Belarus, Botswana, Brunei Darussalam, Burkina Faso, Cambodia, Côte d'Ivoire, Cuba, Dominica, East Timor, Gabon, Ghana, Kiribati, Madagascar, Malawi, Maldives, Marshall Islands, Micronesia, Nauru, Palau, Papua New Guinea, Samoa, Seychelles, Solomon Islands, Tuvalu, Vanuatu, Zambia and Zimbabwe who are permanent residents of Pacific Alliance member states (Colombia, Mexico and Peru) may enter Chile without a visa for up to 90 days.

==== Fee-exempt ====
Citizens of Morocco require a visa but may obtain it free of charge for tourist proposes.

=== Permanent residents of Argentina ===
Foreign citizens (of any nationality) who are permanent residents of Argentina can enter Chile for tourism purposes using their Argentine identity card (DNI) without a passport or visa.

=== Non-ordinary passports ===
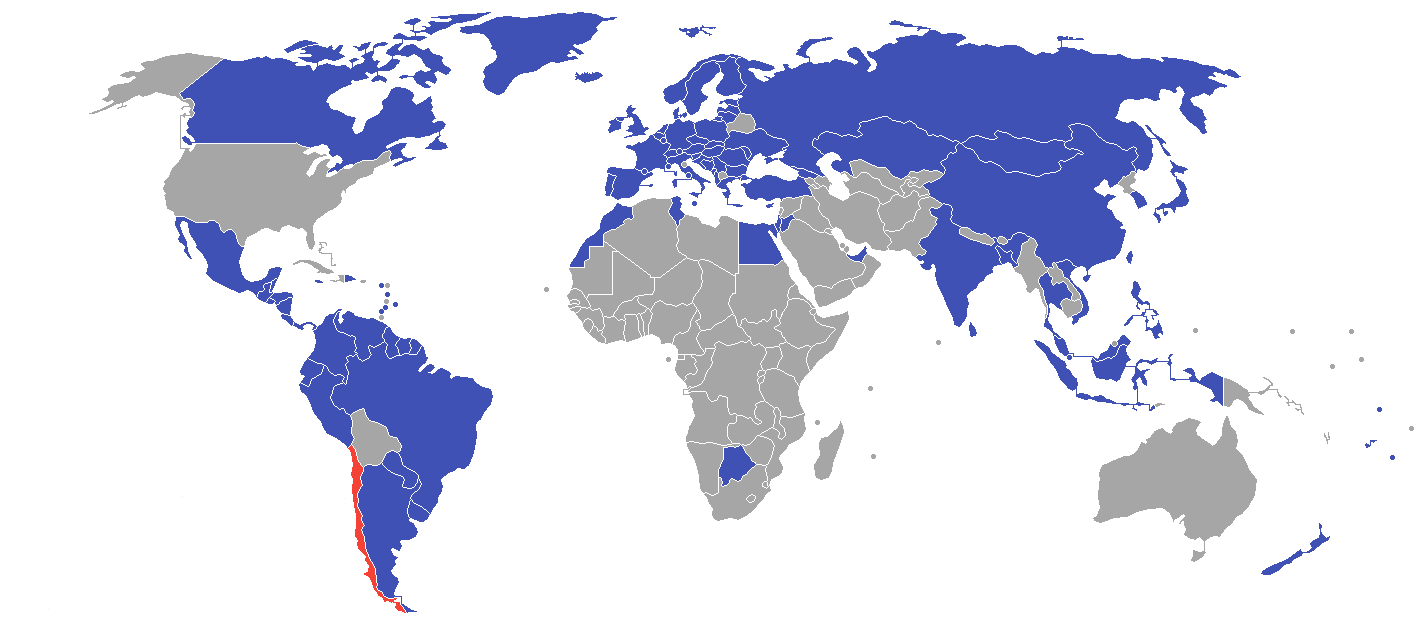
Chile Visa free access for diplomatic and service category passports

Holders of diplomatic or service category passports of Armenia, Azerbaijan, Bangladesh, Belarus, Botswana, China, Dominica, Dominican Republic, Egypt, India, Jordan, Kyrgyzstan, Mongolia, Morocco, Philippines, Sri Lanka, Suriname, Tunisia, Tuvalu and Venezuela do not require a visa.

Holders of diplomatic or service category passports of Antigua and Barbuda, Australia, Bahamas, Bolivia, Fiji, Mauritius, North Macedonia, Saint Lucia, San Marino, South Africa, Trinidad and Tobago and United States require a visa.

Agreement with Bolivia was denounced on 4 August 2016 and not applied from 4 February 2017.However, the visa-free agreement for holders of diplomatic passports from both countries was approved by the Chilean parliament in January, 2026.

=== APEC Business Travel Card ===
Holders of passports issued by the following countries who possess an APEC Business Travel Card (ABTC) containing the "CHL" code on the reverse that it is valid for travel to Chile can enter visa-free for business trips for up to 90 days.

ABTCs are issued to citizens of:

- Australia
- Brunei
- China
- Hong Kong
- Indonesia
- Japan
- South Korea
- Malaysia
- Mexico
- New Zealand
- Papua New Guinea
- Peru
- Philippines
- Russia
- Singapore
- Taiwan
- Thailand
- Vietnam

== Visa extension ==
If a holder of a tourist visa wishes to extend their Visa, they can do so at Chile's Extranjería Department and there is a charge of $100 USD.

Another way of extending your tourist visa is to leave the country and come back in. This can only be done twice in succession. There is no fee to do so.

== Visitor statistics ==
Most visitors arriving in Chile were from the following countries of nationality:

Country	2017	2016	2015
Argentina	3,323,771	2,900,709	1,946,876
Brazil	544,857	438,915	455,965
Bolivia	479,690	437,154	419,822
Peru	394,204	403,605	359,857
United States	211,718	208,623	186,613
Venezuela	156,150	71,034	45,918
Colombia	133 341	119,324	105,317
Haiti	111,430	46,962	13,112
France	83,758	77,129	69,995
Spain	80 690	77,987	73,362
Germany	78,262	73,854	71,055
Uruguay	69,912	46,698	39,771
United Kingdom	54,714	51,611	46,520
Australia	51,978	50,968	46,010
Mexico	48,051	44,536	45,316
Italy	46,131	41,523	33,512
Ecuador	42,935	38,370	31,993
Canada	39,639	38,388	33,915
China	30,774	22,992	15,404
Paraguay	27,850	24,051	25,284
Total	6,263,341	5,448,975	4,287,546

== See also ==
- Visa requirements for Chilean citizens
