= Visa requirements for Ecuadorian citizens =

Administrative entry restrictions

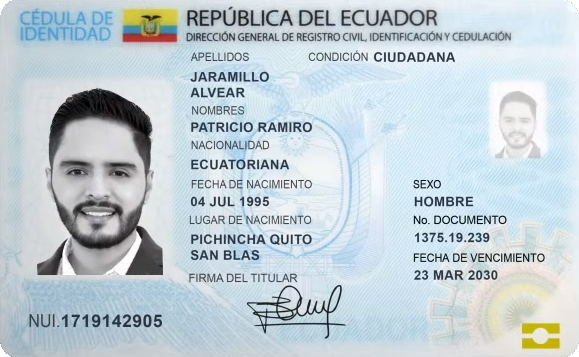
An Ecuadorian identity card is valid for travel to most South American countries.

Visa requirements for Ecuadorian citizens are administrative entry restrictions by the authorities of other states placed on citizens of Ecuador.

As of 2026, Ecuadorian citizens had visa-free or visa on arrival access to 93 countries and territories, ranking the Ecuadorian passport 48th in the world according to the Henley Passport Index.

Citizens of Ecuador do not need a passport when travelling to Argentina, Bolivia, Brazil, Colombia, Paraguay, Peru, and Uruguay. For these countries, they may use just their national identification cards.

Most South American countries do not require a passport as a document to allow Ecuadorian citizens to visit their countries as tourist; a national or state-issued ID card is enough. Nevertheless, this piece of identification must be in good conservation state and less than ten years from its issue date, according to agreements signed in Mercosur's treaties.

== Visa requirements map ==
Visa requirements for Ecuadorian citizens holding ordinary passports Ecuador Freedom of movement / ID card valid Visa not required Visa on arrival eVisa Visa available both on arrival or online Visa required

== Visa requirements ==
Visa requirements for holders of normal passports traveling for tourist purposes:

Ecuador is an associated member of Andean Community. As such, its citizens enjoy unlimited access to any of the full members (Bolivia, Colombia and Peru) and other associated members (Argentina, Brazil, Paraguay and Uruguay) with the right to residence and work, with no requirement other than nationality. In the other hand, they signed an agreement with the Mercosur.

Citizens of these nine countries (including Ecuador) may apply for the grant of "temporary residence" for up to two years in another country of the bloc. Then, they may apply for "permanent residence" just before the term of their "temporary residence" expires.
Implementation has varied: Chile limits the benefit to nationals of initial signatories, excluding Peru, Colombia, and Ecuador. Venezuela never ratified the accord, and Argentina and Uruguay grant residence to all South Americans regardless of reciprocity.

Country	Visa requirement	Allowed stay	Notes (excluding departure fees)
Afghanistan	eVisa	30 days	Visitors must arrive at Kabul International (KBL).
Albania	eVisa	90 days	Visa is not required for Holders of a valid multiple-entry Schengen, UK or US visa has been previously used once or residence permit of Ireland, Schengen, UK, US or UAE 10 years.
Algeria	Visa required		Visitors on tours organized to some southern regions by an approved travel agency may obtain a visa on arrival for up to 30 days.
Andorra	Visa required		Andorra imposes no visa requirements on its visitors, however entry is not possible without entering Spain or France first, multiple entry Schengen area visa required.
Angola	Visa required		
Antigua and Barbuda	Visa not required		
Argentina	Visa not required	90 days	Entry is allowed with a valid Ecuadorian identity card that is less than 10 years old.; Ecuadorians can live and work legally in Argentina under the Mercosur (and Associated Members) immigration agreement with no requirement other than being a citizen at birth or a naturalized citizen for over 5 years, and passing a background check.
Armenia	Visa not required	180 days	
Australia	Visa required		May apply online (Online Visitor e600 visa).
Austria	Visa required		
Azerbaijan	eVisa	30 days	
Bahamas	Visa not required	3 months	
Bahrain	eVisa / Visa on arrival	14 days	Visa is also obtainable online.
Bangladesh	Visa on arrival	30 days	Only Available if traveling from a country where there is no Bangladeshi Embassy/High Commission/Consulate; Not available at all entry points.
Barbados	Visa not required		
Belarus	Visa not required	30 days	
Belgium	Visa required		
Belize	Visa required		
Benin	eVisa	30 days	Must have an international vaccination certificate.; Three types of electronic visa are offered: the e-Visa valid for 30 days for a single entry (50 EUR), the e-Visa valid for 30 days for several (multiple) entries (75 EUR), and the e-Visa valid for 90 days to make several (multiple) entries (100 EUR).
Bhutan	eVisa	90 days	Sustainable Development Fee of 200 USD per day for almost all visitors to Bhutan.
Bolivia	Visa not required	90 days	Entry is allowed with a valid Ecuadorian identity card that is less than 10 years old.; Ecuadorians can live and work legally in Bolivia under the Mercosur (and Associated Members) immigration agreement with no requirement other than being a citizen at birth or a naturalized citizen for over 5 years, and passing a background check.
Bosnia and Herzegovina	Visa required		
Botswana	eVisa	3 months	
Brazil	Visa not required	90 days	Entry is allowed with a valid Ecuadorian identity card that is less than 10 years old.; Ecuadorians can live and work legally in Brazil under the Mercosur (and Associated Members) immigration agreement with no requirement other than being a citizen at birth or a naturalized citizen for over 5 years, and passing a background check.
Brunei	Visa required		
Bulgaria	Visa required		
Burkina Faso	eVisa		
Burundi	Visa on arrival	1 month	
Cambodia	eVisa / Visa on arrival	30 days	Visa is also obtainable online.
Cameroon	eVisa		
Canada	Visa required		US permanent residents (Green card) holders can enter visa-free.
Cape Verde	Visa on arrival	45 days	Not available at all entry points.
Central African Republic	Visa required		
Chad	eVisa		
Chile	Visa not required	90 days	Entry is allowed with a valid Ecuadorian identity card that is less than 10 years old.; Mercosur visa not available for Ecuadorians to live and work.
China	Visa not required	30 days	Visa-free for Hong Kong for 90 days.; Visa-free for Macau for 30 days.; Visa-free for mainland China for 30 days.
Colombia	Visa not required	90 days	Entry is allowed with a valid Ecuadorian identity card that is less than 10 years old.; Ecuadorians can live and work legally in Colombia under the Mercosur (and Associated Members) immigration agreement with no requirement other than being a citizen at birth or a naturalized citizen for over 5 years, and passing a background check.
Comoros	Visa on arrival	45 days	
Republic of the Congo	Visa required		
Democratic Republic of the Congo	eVisa	7 days	
Costa Rica	Visa required		No visa required if holding an Multiple Entry Visa for the United States, Canada, EU or Japan.
Côte d'Ivoire	eVisa	3 months	
Croatia	Visa required		
Cuba	eVisa	90 days	Can be extended up to 90 days with a fee.
Cyprus	Visa required		
Czech Republic	Visa required		
Denmark	Visa required		
Djibouti	eVisa	90 days	
Dominica	Visa not required	6 months	
Dominican Republic	Visa not required	90 days	
Egypt	eVisa / Visa on arrival	30 days	
El Salvador	Visa not required	3 months	
Equatorial Guinea	eVisa		
Eritrea	Visa required		
Estonia	Visa required		
Eswatini	Visa required		
Ethiopia	eVisa	90 days	e-Visa holders must arrive via Addis Ababa Bole International Airport
Fiji	Online Visa		
Finland	Visa required		
France	Visa required		
Gabon	eVisa	90 days	e-Visa holders must arrive via Libreville International Airport.
Gambia	Visa not required		
Georgia	Visa not required	1 year	
Germany	Visa required		
Ghana	Visa required		
Greece	Visa required		
Grenada	Visa not required	3 months	
Guatemala	Visa required		Visa waived for a maximum stay of 90 days within 180 days for valid visa holders or residents of Canada, the European Union member states, or the United States .
Guinea	eVisa	90 days	
Guinea-Bissau	Visa on arrival	90 days	
Guyana	Visa not required	90 days	
Haiti	Visa not required	3 months	
Honduras	Visa not required	90 days	
Hungary	Visa required		
Iceland	Visa required		
India	eVisa	30 days	e-Visa holders must arrive via 32 designated airports (Note: Ahmedabad; Amritsar; Bagdogra; Bengaluru; Bhubaneswar; Chandigarh; Chennai; Coimbatore; Delhi; Gaya; Goa-Dabolim; Goa-Manohar; Guwahati; Hyderabad; Indore; Jaipur; Kannur; Kochi; Kolkata; Kozhikode; Lucknow; Madurai; Mangaluru; Mumbai; Nagpur; Port Blair; Pune; Surat; Thiruvananthapuram; Tiruchirappalli; Varanasi; Visakhapatnam) or 5 designated seaports. (Note: Chennai; Cochin; Mormugao (Goa); Mumbai; Mangalore); An Indian e-Tourist Visa may only be obtained twice within 1 calendar year.; Foreigners of Pakistani origin or who hold a Pakistani Passport are not eligible for an e-Visa. Foreigners who are not Pakistani nationals, but whose parents or grandparents (either paternal or maternal) were born in, or were permanent residents in Pakistan, are also not eligible for an e-Visa.
Indonesia	e-VOA / Visa on arrival	30 days	
Iran	eVisa	30 days	
Iraq	eVisa	30 days	
Ireland	Visa required		Visa is issued free of charge.
Israel	Electronic Travel Authorization	3 months	
Italy	Visa required		
Jamaica	Visa not required	90 days	
Japan	Visa required		May transit without visa.; Eligible for an e-Visa if residing in one these countries Australia, Brazil, Cambodia, Canada, India, Saudi Arabia, Singapore, South Africa, Taiwan, United Arab Emirates, United Kingdom, United States.; May apply online
Jordan	eVisa / Visa on arrival		Visa can be obtained upon arrival, it will cost a total of 40 JOD, obtainable at most international ports of entry and land border crossings. (except King Hussein/Allenby Bridge)
Kazakhstan	Visa not required	30 days	30 days within 180 day period.
Kenya	Electronic Travel Authorisation	90 days	Applications can be submitted up to 90 days prior to travel and must be submitted at least 3 days in advance.; eTA fee is 32.50 USD.; Proof of reservation at the hotel where visitors plan to stay is required (if staying with friends, an invitation letter is also acceptable).; Yellow fever vaccination certificate is required if coming from endemic countries.
Kiribati	Visa required		
North Korea	Visa required		
South Korea	Electronic Travel Authorization	90 days	The validity period of a K-ETA is 3 years from the date of approval.
Kuwait	Visa required		e-Visa can be obtained for holders of a Residence Permit issued by a GCC member state under the following conditions: To be 18 years old and over.; The residence permit for a GCC state must be valid for at least another 3 months.; To be accompanied by the sponsor of the residence permit if the sponsor is an individual.; Does not apply to holders of a GCC Student Visa and Non-Skilled Worker Visa
Kyrgyzstan	eVisa	60 days	e-Visa holders must arrive via Manas International Airport or Osh Airport or through land crossings with China (at Irkeshtam and Torugart), Kazakhstan (at Ak-jol, Ak-Tilek, Chaldybar, Chon-Kapka), Tajikistan (at Bor-Dobo, Kulundu, Kyzyl-Bel) and Uzbekistan (at Dostuk).
Laos	eVisa / Visa on arrival	30 days	18 (Note: Savannakhet Airport; Lanetoui - Mengkang (China); Meuangmom - Wan Pong (Myanmar); Banvang - Ban Khok Phai (Thailand); Namngeun - Huay Kon (Thailand); Paksan - Bueng Kan (Thailand); Paktaphan - Pak Saeng (Thailand); Pangmon - Ban Huak (Thailand); Phoudou (Thailand); Dak ta ock - Nam Giang (Vietnam); La Lai (Vietnam); Namkan (Vietnam); Namphao - Cau Treo (Vietnam); Namsoy - Na Meo (Vietnam); Naphao - Cha Lo (Vietnam); Pahang - Long Sap (Vietnam); Panghok - Tây Trang (Vietnam); Phoukeua - Bo Y (Vietnam)) of the 33 border crossings are only open to regular visa holders.; e-Visa may be used to enter Laos through the Luang Prabang, Pakse and Vientiane international airports, 3 Thai-Lao Friendship Bridges (Note: Vientiane (Friendship Bridge 1); Savannakhet (Friendship Bridge 2); Bokeo (Friendship Bridge 4)), in Boten (road and railroad), and in Vientiane (at Khamsavath railway station).; Visa on arrival is available at the Luang Prabang, Pakse and Vientiane international airports, 4 Thai-Lao Friendship Bridges (Note: Vientiane (Friendship Bridge 1); Savannakhet (Friendship Bridge 2); Khammouane (Friendship Bridge 3); Bokeo (Friendship Bridge 4)) and 7 border crossings. (Note: Nongnokkheane - Trapeang Kriel (Cambodia); Boten - Bo han (China); Golden Triangle/Samliemkham (Thailand); Khamsavath railway station (Thailand); Namheuang - Ban Na Kraseng (Thailand); Vang tao - Chongmek (Thailand); Dansavan - Lao Bảo (Vietnam))
Latvia	Visa required		
Lebanon	Visa required		
Lesotho	Visa required		
Liberia	e-VOA	3 months	
Libya	eVisa		
Liechtenstein	Visa required		
Lithuania	Visa required		
Luxembourg	Visa required		
Madagascar	eVisa / Visa on arrival	90 days	For stays of 61 to 90 days, the visa fee is 59 USD.
Malawi	Visa not required		
Malaysia	Visa not required	30 days	
Maldives	Free visa on arrival	30 days	
Mali	Visa required		
Malta	Visa required		
Marshall Islands	Visa on arrival	90 days	
Mauritania	eVisa	30 days	
Mauritius	Visa on arrival	60 days	
Mexico	Visa required		Ecuadorian citizens may enter Mexico for 180 days if they hold a valid visa or permanent residence issued by the U.S., Canada, Japan, United Kingdom, Chile, Colombia, or a country part of the Schengen area.
Micronesia	Visa not required	30 days	
Moldova	Visa not required	90 days	
Monaco	Visa required		
Mongolia	Visa not required	90 days	
Montenegro	Visa required		
Morocco	Electronic Travel Authorization (AEVM)		
Mozambique	eVisa / Visa on arrival	30 days	
Myanmar	eVisa	28 days	e-Visa holders must arrive via Yangon, Nay Pyi Taw or Mandalay airports or via land border crossings with Thailand — Tachileik, Myawaddy and Kawthaung or India — Rih Khaw Dar and Tamu.; e-Visa is available for tourism only.
Namibia	eVisa / Visa on arrival	90 days / 3 months	Available at Hosea Kutako International Airport, Kalahari Border Crossing and Walvis Bay Airport.
Nauru	Visa required		
Nepal	eVisa / Visa on arrival	90 days	
Netherlands	Visa required		
New Zealand	Visa required		May transit without visa if transit is through Auckland Airport and for no longer than 24 hours, subject to meeting character requirements and obtaining an Electronic Travel Authority prior to departure.; Holders of an Australian Permanent Resident Visa or Resident Return Visa may be granted a New Zealand Resident Visa on arrival permitting indefinite stay (pursuant to the Trans-Tasman Travel Arrangement), subject to meeting character requirements and obtaining an Electronic Travel Authority prior to departure.
Nicaragua	Visa not required	90 days	
Niger	Visa required		
Nigeria	eVisa	30 days	
North Macedonia	Visa required		
Norway	Visa required		
Oman	Visa not required / eVisa	14 days / 30 days	
Pakistan	eVisa	3 months	
Palau	Free visa on arrival	30 days	
Panama	Visa not required	90 days	
Papua New Guinea	eVisa	60 days	Available at Gurney Airport (Alotau), Mount Hagen Airport, Port Moresby Airport and Tokua Airport (Rabaul).
Paraguay	Visa not required	90 days	Entry is allowed with a valid Ecuadorian identity card that is less than 10 years old.; Ecuadorians can live and work legally in Paraguay under the Mercosur (and Associated Members) immigration agreement with no requirement other than being a citizen at birth or a naturalized citizen for over 5 years, and passing a background check.
Peru	Visa not required	180 days	Entry is allowed with a valid Ecuadorian identity card that is less than 10 years old.; Ecuadorians can live and work legally in Peru under the Mercosur (and Associated Members) immigration agreement with no requirement other than being a citizen at birth or a naturalized citizen for over 5 years, and passing a background check.
Philippines	Visa not required	30 days	
Poland	Visa required		
Portugal	Visa required		
Qatar	Visa not required	30 days	
Romania	Visa required		
Russia	Visa not required	90 days	90 days within any 180 day period.
Rwanda	eVisa / Visa on arrival	30 days	
Saint Kitts and Nevis	Visa not required	3 months	
Saint Lucia	Visa on arrival	6 weeks	
Saint Vincent and the Grenadines	Visa not required	3 months	
Samoa	Entry permit on arrival	90 days	
San Marino	Visa required		San Marino imposes no visa requirements on its visitors, however entry is not possible without entering Italy first, multiple entry Schengen area visa required.
São Tomé and Príncipe	eVisa		
Saudi Arabia	Visa required		Residents of GCC countries can apply for Saudi e-Visas online and residents of the United States, United Kingdom and European Union may apply for a visa on arrival
Senegal	Visa required		
Serbia	eVisa	90 days	90 days within any 180-day period. Transfers allowed.; Visa-free for a maximum stay of 90 days for valid visa holders or residents of the European Union member states and the United States.
Seychelles	Electronic Border System	3 months	Application can be submitted up to 30 days before travel.; Visitors must upload a reservation confirmation(s) for each visitor's location of stay in Seychelles.; Yellow fever vaccination certificate is required if coming from endemic countries.; Payment of the fee (EUR 10) by credit or debit card.; Valid for one journey only and it expires once exit the country.
Sierra Leone	eVisa	3 months	
Singapore	Visa not required	30 days	
Slovakia	Visa required		
Slovenia	Visa required		
Solomon Islands	Free Visitor's permit on arrival	3 months	
Somalia	eVisa	30 days	
South Africa	Visa not required	90 days	
South Sudan	eVisa		Obtainable online.; Printed visa authorization must be presented at the time of travel.
Spain	Visa required		
Sri Lanka	eVisa	30 days	
Sudan	Visa required		
Suriname	Visa not required	90 days	An entrance fee of USD 50 or EUR 50 must be paid online prior to arrival.; Multiple entry e-Visa is also available.
Sweden	Visa required		
Switzerland	Visa required		
Syria	eVisa		
Tajikistan	Visa not required	30 days	
Tanzania	eVisa / Visa on arrival	90 days	
Thailand	Visa not required	60 days	
Timor-Leste	Visa on arrival	30 days	Not available at all entry points.
Togo	eVisa	15 days	
Tonga	Visa required		
Trinidad and Tobago	Visa not required	90 days	
Tunisia	Visa required		
Turkey	Visa not required	3 months	
Turkmenistan	Visa required		When transiting between two non-bordering countries, visitors can obtain a Turkmenistan transit visa for a five-day stay. This must be applied for in advance at the Turkmenistan Embassy. Visitors must also submit copies of the visas for the country of entry into Turkmenistan and the country of departure from Turkmenistan. Visa fee is 20 USD.
Tuvalu	Visa on arrival	1 month	
Uganda	eVisa	3 months	Determined at the port of entry.
Ukraine	Visa not required	90 days	
United Arab Emirates	Visa not required	90 days	
United Kingdom	Visa required		
United States	Visa required		
Uruguay	Visa not required	3 months	Entry is allowed with a valid Ecuadorian identity card that is less than 10 years old.; Ecuadorians can live and work legally in Uruguay under the Mercosur (and Associated Members) immigration agreement with no requirement other than being a citizen at birth or a naturalized citizen for over 5 years, and passing a background check.
Uzbekistan	eVisa	30 days	5-day visa-free transit at the international airports if holding a confirmed onward ticket for a flight to a third country.
Vanuatu	eVisa	120 days	
Vatican City	Visa required		
Venezuela	Visa not required		
Vietnam	eVisa	90 days	Phú Quốc without a visa for up to 30 days.
Yemen	Visa required		Yemen introduced an e-Visa system for visitors who meet certain eligibility requirements (group travel of 10 or more people, business trips, and transit etc.).
Zambia	eVisa / Visa on arrival	90 days	
Zimbabwe	eVisa / Visa on arrival	1 month	

=== Unrecognized or partially recognized countries ===
Countries	Conditions of access	Notes
Kosovo	Visa required	Visa not required for holders of a valid biometric residence permit issued by one of the Schengen member states or a valid multi-entry Schengen Visa, a holder of a valid Laissez-Passer issued by United Nations Organizations, NATO, OSCE, Council of Europe or European Union a holder of a valid travel documents issued by EU Member and Schengen States, United States of America, Canada, Australia and Japan based on the 1951 Convention on Refugee Status or the 1954 Convention on the Status of Stateless Persons, as well as holders of valid travel documents for foreigners (max. 15 days stay)
North Cyprus	Visa not required	
Palestine	Visa not required	
Taiwan	eVisa	

== Dependent and autonomous territories ==
Countries	Conditions of access	Notes
China
Hong Kong	Visa not required	90 days
Macau	Visa not required	30 days
Denmark
Faroe Islands	Visa required	
Greenland	Visa required	
France
French Guiana	Visa not required	90 days
French Polynesia	Visa required	
(France) French West Indies	Visa not required	90 days; includes overseas departments of Guadeloupe and Martinique.
(France) Saint Martin and Saint Barthélemy	Visa required	
Mayotte	Visa required	
New Caledonia	Visa required	90 days
Réunion	Visa required	
Saint Pierre and Miquelon	Visa required	
Wallis and Futuna	Visa required	
Netherlands
Aruba	Visa not required	90 days
Caribbean Netherlands	Visa not required	90 days (includes Bonaire, Sint Eustatius and Saba)
Curaçao	Visa not required	90 days
Sint Maarten	Visa not required	90 days
New Zealand
Cook Islands	Visa not required	31 days
Niue	Visa not required	30 days
Tokelau	Visa required	
United Kingdom
Akrotiri and Dhekelia	Visa required	Aktotiri and Dhekelia joined the Schengen area following Brexit.
Anguilla	eVisa	Holders of a valid visa or residence permit for the United Kingdom, United States or Canada do not need a visa.
Bermuda	Visa required	Can transit visa-free via United Kingdom.
British Virgin Islands	Visa not required	1 month entry stamp on arrival.
Cayman Islands	Visa not required	6 months
Falkland Islands	Visa required	
Gibraltar	Visa required	Gibraltar's status to join the Schengen Area is yet to be confirmed.
Guernsey	Visa required	
Isle of Man	Visa required	
Jersey	Visa required	
Montserrat	eVisa	Holders of a valid visa for the United Kingdom, United States, Canada or an EU country do not need a visa.
Saint Helena	eVisa	
Turks and Caicos	Visa not required	90 days
United States
American Samoa	Visa required	
Guam	Visa required	
Northern Mariana Islands	Visa required	
U.S. Virgin Islands	Visa required	
Puerto Rico	Visa required	

== See also ==
- Visa policy of Ecuador
- Ecuadorian passport
