= Ecuadorian passport =

Passport issued to citizens of Ecuador

Ecuadorian passport; Pasaporte ecuatoriano
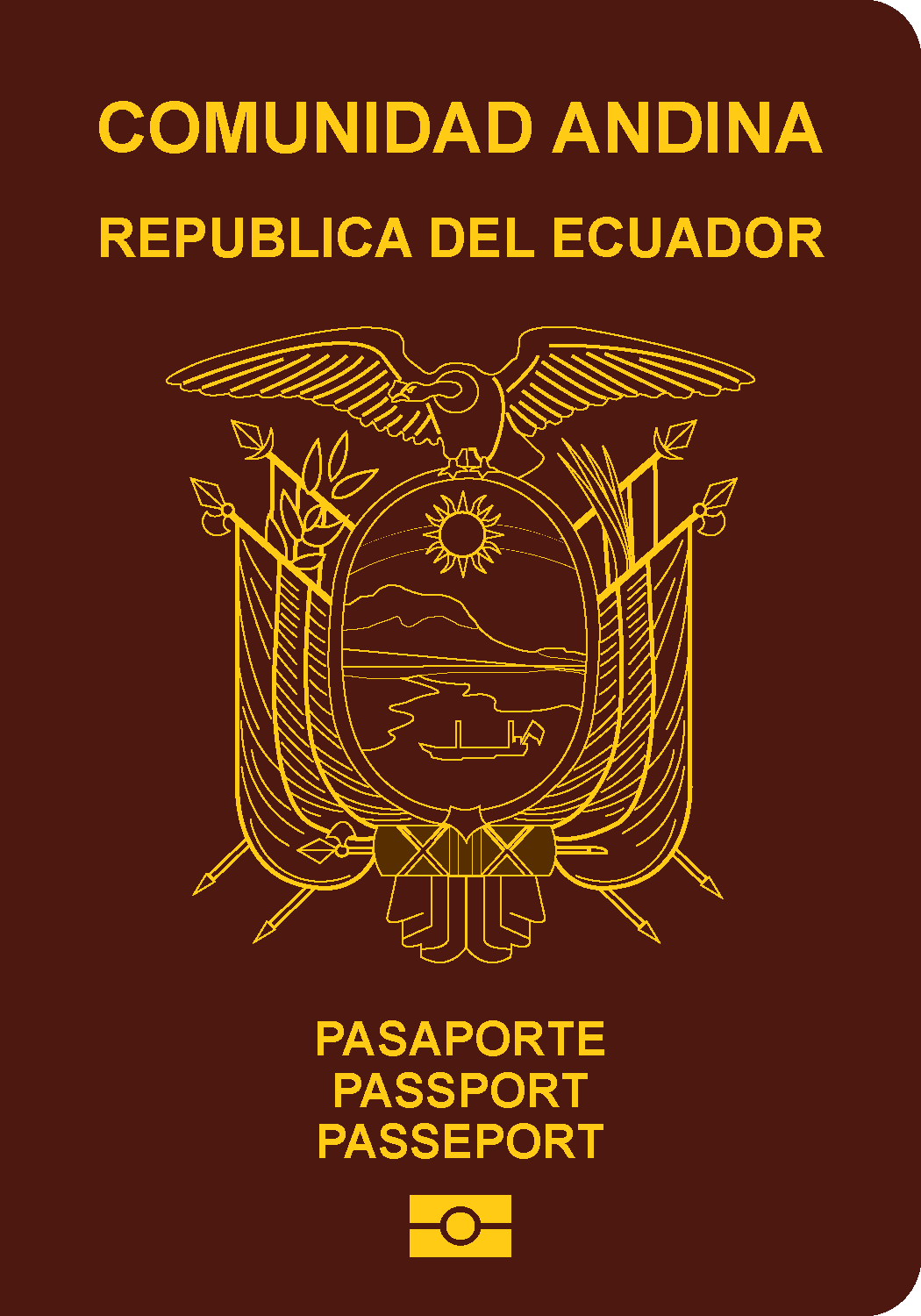
- The front cover of an Ecuadorian biometric passport (with chip)
- Type: Passport
- Issued by: Ecuador In Ecuador: Registro Civil, Identificación y Cedulación Elsewhere in the world: Minister of Foreign Affairs Embassies & Consulates
- First issued: September 14, 2020 (biometric passport)
- Purpose: Identification
- Valid in: All countries
- Eligibility: Ecuadorian citizenship
- Expiration: Ten years
- Cost: US$90.00 ($45.00 for seniors)

An Ecuadorian passport (Spanish: Pasaporte ecuatoriano) is an identity document issued to citizens of Ecuador for the purpose of international travel. It is issued by the Registro Civil, Identificación y Cedulación (Civil Registry) in Ecuador, and the Minister of Foreign Affair Embassies & Consulates abroad. The Ecuadorian passport is a type of Andean passport, allowing for free rights of movement and residence in any of the Andean Community members. The Ecuador passport is normally issued for 10 years and has the benefit of having "visa-free" status for Andean Community and Mercosur members nations, and several Central American nations.

They are also given a document called an Andean Card at any Andean airport, with which they can travel freely throughout the territory of the Andean Community.

Since October 2020 in the city of Quito, a new biometric passport has been implemented.

== See also ==
- Visa requirements for Ecuadorian citizens
- List of passports
