= Chilean nationality law =

Chilean Citizenship Act

National Congress of Chile
- Long title: An Act relating to Chilean citizenship
- Territorial extent: Chile
- Enacted by: Government of Chile

Related legislation
- Constitution of Chile
- Status: Current legislation

Chilean nationality law is based on both principles of jus soli and jus sanguinis. Nationality law is regulated by Article 10 of the Political Constitution of the Republic of Chile. The legal means to acquire nationality, formal membership in a nation, differ from the relationship of rights and obligations between a national and the nation, known as citizenship.

== Birth in Chile ==
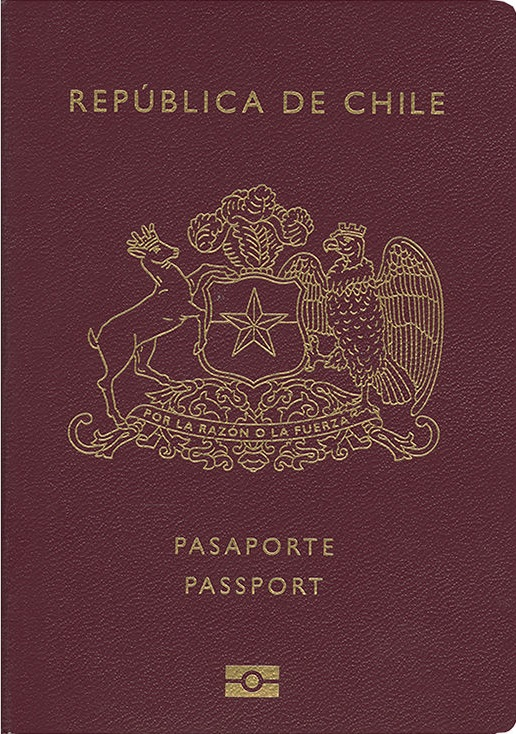
Chilean passport

Any person born in Chile acquires Chilean nationality at birth. The only two exceptions apply to children of persons in the service of a foreign government (like foreign diplomats) and to the children of foreigners who do not reside in the country. However, these children can apply to acquire Chilean nationality.

== Chilean nationality by descent ==
Children of Chilean nationals born abroad acquire the Chilean nationality at birth, if any of their parents or grandparents were Chilean through the principle of jus soli or naturalisation.

== Naturalization ==
Foreigners may apply for Chilean nationality if they meet the following criteria:

- permanent residence in Chile
- five years continuous residence in Chile.

== Reclamation of the Chilean nationality ==
If any administrative authority should deprive a person of their Chilean nationality, it can be reclaimed personally or by anyone on their behalf at the Supreme Court, according to Article 12 of the Chilean Constitution.

== Dual nationality ==
Chile allows dual nationality under the new laws.

== History ==
Chile declared independence from Spain in 1818. The following year, the government decreed that indigenous populations were free and able to participate equally, as were other inhabitants of the nation. Differing from other Latin American countries, the Chilean Constitution has consistently regulated nationality. Chile was also among the four nations which did not require a wife to assume her husband's nationality before 1910. (Note: The other three were Argentina, Paraguay, and Uruguay.) The first non-provisional constitution, established in 1822 upon after independence from Spain, granted nationality to those born in the country or to those born outside the territory to Chilean parents. The following year the Constitution was replaced. The 1823 constitution primarily established birthright nationals as those born within the country or to nationals of the country, if they resided in the territory, and those born abroad to fathers of Chilean descent or foreign fathers, who were working in the service of the government. It allowed the legislature to grant individual nationality at its discretion, foreigners to naturalize, and identified that persons, who were married to Chileans and engaged in professions, were considered to be Chilean. Other foreigners could naturalize by engaging in a profession for one year, or working in agriculture for five years. Slavery was outlawed and those who engaged in the slave trade were prohibited from obtaining nationality in Chile under the Constitution.

Despite subsequent constitutional changes the provisions on nationality from 1823 remained in place for almost two centuries. The Chilean Civil Code of 1855, recognized equal rights between the sexes except in the case of married women. Under the code, married women were legally incapacitated and their civil rights were subject to their husbands' authority. A wife was required to share his residence and domicile, while living in Chile. (Note: Lepin Molina states residencia (residence) per Article 133; however, the Chilean Code also uses the term domicilio (domicile) in Article 71: "La mujer casada no divorciada sigue el domicilio del marido, miéntras éste reside en Chile". [The undivorced married woman follows the husband's domicile, while he resides in Chile.] Chilean interpretation of domicile is that it is the permanent residence which defines not only one's civil address for establishing the jurisdiction of rights to which they are entitled, but also for establishing the jurisdiction for their relationship to the state. Article 60 of the code specifies "La constitución i efectos del domicilio político pertenecen al Derecho Internacional". [The constitution and effects of the political domicile pertain to international law.]) Under the Constitution of 1925, birth abroad indicated that a child could have birthright nationality if either their mother or father was in service to the nation. Children of diplomats were not required to reside in Chile, but other children born abroad could acquire Chilean citizenship, if their parents were Chilean, by settling in Chile. Children born within Chile to foreigners or Chilean parents could derive nationality from their parents by taking up residence in the country. In the case that the child's parents were foreigners, it had to declare within reaching majority, its intent to choose Chilean nationality. The 1925 Constitution excluded from birthright nationality children born in the territory to foreign parents who were in service to other governments and children born to transient migrants. It also specified for the first time that nationality could be lost in Article 6 by having another nationality or assisting an enemy of the state.

As nationality was deemed a personal right, a change in nationality of one spouse, or the state of marriage, did not impact the other spouse under Chilean law, unless by marriage to a foreigner another nationality was automatically acquired. If marriage bestowed another nationality, Chilean nationality automatically was canceled. A foreign woman who married a Chilean national and lost her nationality because of the marriage as proscribed by foreign law after 1928 could be issued a passport, which did not signify recognition of Chilean nationality. A change in 1957 amended the constitution to allow dual nationality for Spanish nationals or in the case that obtaining another nationality was not a voluntary act. During the dictatorship of Augusto Pinochet, Decree 175, issued in 1973, allowed for nationality to be revoked for engaging in activities from abroad which opposed his regime. This act was incorporated into the Constitution of 1980, but extended revocation of nationality for opposition to Pinochet to encompass nationals residing anywhere. Under the 1980 Constitution, the age for majority was lowered from 21 years of age to 18 and derived nationality for children born abroad was extended to include grandparents, if at least one of them was born in Chile. From 2005, Chilean nationality did not depend on renouncing any other nationality.

== See also ==
- Visa requirements for Chilean citizens
