= Visa policy of Ecuador =

Policy on permits required to enter Ecuador

Most visitors to Ecuador may enter without a visa. However, visitors from certain countries must first obtain a visa in advance before being allowed to enter.

Citizens of most countries may stay in Ecuador for up to 90 days without a visa. All visitors must hold a passport valid for at least 6 months, (except citizens of Argentina, Bolivia, Brazil, Chile, Colombia, Paraguay, Peru and Uruguay who may also enter Ecuador with an ID card).

== Visa policy map ==
Visa policy of Ecuador Ecuador Visa not required - may enter with an ID card (90 days) Visa not required (90 days) eVisa

== Electronic visa (e-Visa) ==
Citizens of the following countries and territories require a visa may apply for an e-Visa:

- Afghanistan
- Albania
- Angola
- Bangladesh
- Cameroon
- Chad
- China
- Congo
- DR Congo
- Cuba
- Egypt
- Eritrea
- Ethiopia
- Gambia
- Ghana
- Guinea
- Guinea-Bissau
- Haiti^{1}
- India
- Iran
- Iraq
- Ivory Coast
- Kenya
- Libya
- Macao
- Mali
- Mauritania
- Myanmar
- Nepal
- Nigeria
- North Korea
- Pakistan
- Philippines
- Senegal
- Sierra Leone
- Somalia
- South Sudan
- Sri Lanka
- Sudan
- Syria
- Taiwan
- Tajikistan
- Uzbekistan
- Venezuela^{2}
- Vietnam
- Yemen

_{1 - A visa is not required if holding an approval code.}
_{2 - Expired passports or other ID documentation accepted. Due to the crisis in Venezuela, the government is offering citizens special visas (including humanitarian and temporary permits) to enter the country.}

Date of visa changes
- 1 March 2016: China (resumed until 1 July 2024)

Cancelled:

- 16 November 2015: Afghanistan, Bangladesh, China (resumed on 1 March 2016 until 1 July 2024), Eritrea, Ethiopia, Kenya, Nepal, Nigeria, Pakistan, Somalia, Senegal
- 1 December 2015: Cuba
- 30 March 2017: North Korea
- 26 August 2019: Angola, Cameroon, Congo-Kinshasa, Gambia, Ghana, Guinea, India, Iraq, Libya, Sri Lanka, Syria, Venezuela
- 30 March 2020: Egypt, Iran, Philippines, Vietnam, Yemen
- 17 May 2021: Congo-Brazzaville, Haiti, Ivory Coast, Mali, Myanmar
- 19 November 2022: Albania, Tajikistan, Uzbekistan
- 30 August 2023: Kyrgyzstan
- 19 June 2024: Chad, Guinea-Bissau, Sierra Leone, South Sudan, Sudan
- 1 July 2024: China

== Transit visa ==
On 8 June 2025, Ecuador announced that it will require transit visas for travelers from countries that currently need a visa to enter Ecuador, as well as for citizens from other countries designated by the Ministry of Foreign Affairs and Human Mobility.

== Galapagos ==
All visitors to Galápagos Islands must obtain a Transit Control Card at the airport for a fee.
Visitors may pre-register for the Transit Control Card online, to save some time, but they will still be required to complete the process at the airport.

== Visitor statistics ==
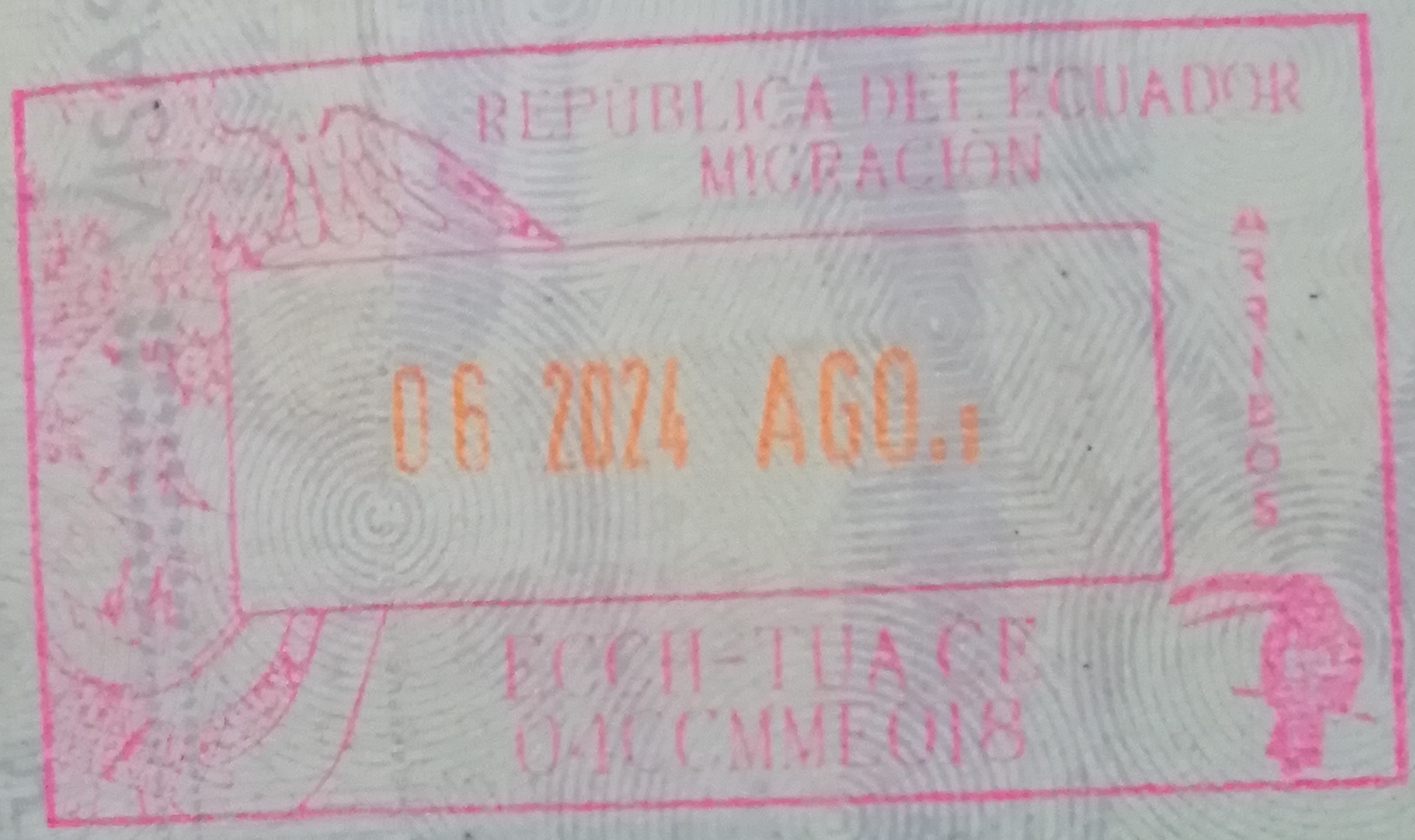
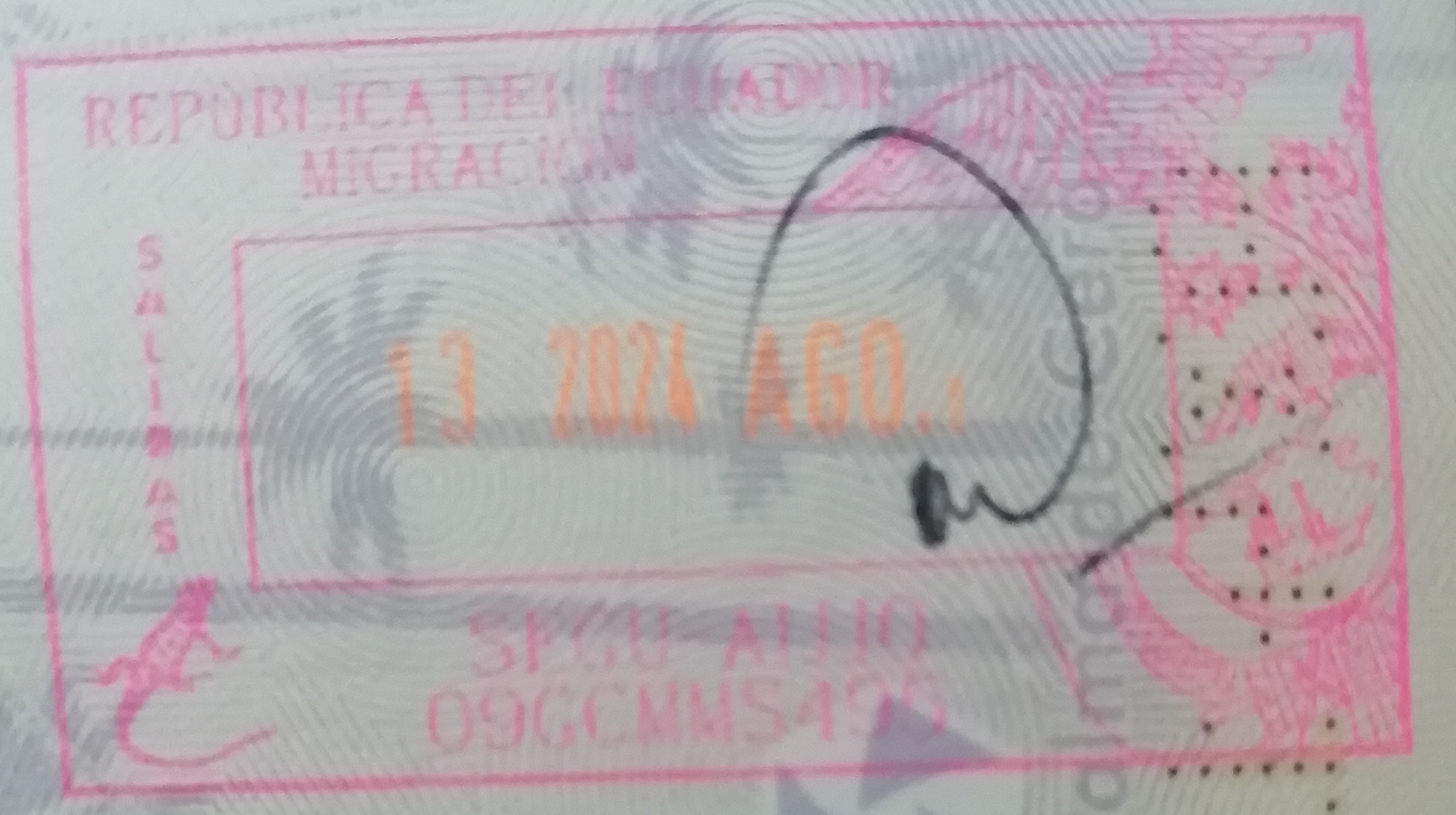
Entry and exit stamps.

Most visitors arriving in Ecuador were from the following countries of nationality:

Country	2018
Venezuela	956,067
United States	351,709
Colombia	323,345
Peru	146,938
Spain	103,008
Chile	45,778
Argentina	40,964
Germany	35,513
Canada	34,335
Mexico	30,425
United Kingdom	28,238
France	27,597
China	26,231
Brazil	22,503
Cuba	20,135
Italy	19,944
Panama	18,460
Netherlands	18,075
Philippines	15,536
India	12,439
Switzerland	11,588
Australia	11,534
Costa Rica	8,639
Belgium	6,988
Bolivia	6,530
Russia	6,215
Uruguay	5,704
Japan	5,555
South Korea	5,370
Ukraine	4,975
Total	2,428,536

== See also ==
- Visa requirements for Ecuadorian citizens
