= Visa requirements for Somali citizens =

Administrative entry restrictions

Visa requirements for Somali citizens are administrative entry restrictions imposed on citizens of Somalia by the authorities of other states.

As of 2026, Somali citizens had visa-free or visa on arrival access to 32 countries and territories, ranking the Somali passport 97th in terms of travel freedom according to the Henley Passport Index.

== Visa requirements map ==
Visa requirements for Somali citizens Somalia Visa free Visa issued upon arrival eVisa Visa available both on arrival or online Visa required prior to arrival Admission refused or restricted

== Visa requirements ==
Country	Visa requirement	Allowed stay	Notes (excluding departure fees)
Afghanistan	eVisa		Visa is not required in case born in Afghanistan or can proof that one of their parents is a national of Afghanistan or born in Afghanistan.; e-Visa : Visitors must arrive at Kabul International (KBL).
Albania	eVisa		
Algeria	Visa required		
Andorra	Visa required		
Angola	Visa required		
Antigua and Barbuda	eVisa		
Argentina	Visa required		
Armenia	Visa required		
Australia and territories	Admission refused		
Austria	Visa required		
Azerbaijan	Visa required		
Bahamas	eVisa		
Bahrain	eVisa	14 days	
Bangladesh	Visa on arrival (Conditional)		Applicants may apply for visa upon arrival as no Bangladeshi diplomatic missions are available in Somalia. Visa issuance at discretion of Bangladeshi authorities. Valid for 30 days.
Barbados	Visa required		
Belarus	Visa required		
Belgium	Visa required		
Belize	Visa required		
Benin	Visa not required	90 days	
Bhutan	eVisa	90 days	Visa fee is 40 USD per person and visa application may be processed within 5 business days with duration of stay of 90 days.; e-Visa applicant is also subject to pay Sustainable Development Fee
Bolivia	eVisa / Visa on arrival	90 days	
Bosnia and Herzegovina	Visa required		
Botswana	eVisa	90 days	
Brazil	Visa required		
Brunei	Visa required		
Bulgaria	Visa required		
Burkina Faso	eVisa	30 days	
Burundi	Visa on arrival	30 days	
Cambodia	eVisa / Visa on arrival	30 days	
Cameroon	eVisa		
Canada	Admission restricted		Somali passports are not recognized as valid travel documents to enter Canada, as there is no authority in Somalia that is recognised by the Canadian Government as being competent to issue passports on behalf of Somalia and thus Canadian immigration authorities will not endorse visas in Somali passports. If a valid visa is issued to a Somali national, it may be placed in a single-use travel document if they do not have travel documents from another country.
Cape Verde	Visa on arrival		Visa on arrival at Sal, Boa Vista, São Vicente or Santiago international airports.; Requirement to register online 5 days before arrival; Also pay the airport security fee of CVE 3400 either online or on arrival.
Central African Republic	Visa required		
Chad	eVisa	90 days	
Chile	Visa required		
China	Visa required		
Colombia	eVisa	90 days	
Comoros	Visa on arrival	45 days	
Republic of the Congo	Visa required		
Democratic Republic of the Congo	eVisa	90 days	
Costa Rica	Visa required		Holders of a valid multiple-entry visa of any member state of the Schengen Area, Canada, or the United States may enter Cost Rica without a visa for maximum stay of 30 days.
Côte d'Ivoire	eVisa	90 days	e-Visa holders must arrive via Port Bouet Airport.
Croatia	Visa required		
Cuba	Visa required		
Cyprus	Visa required		
Czech Republic	Visa required		
Denmark	Visa required		
Djibouti	eVisa	31 days	
Dominica	Visa not required	21 days	
Dominican Republic	Visa required		Holders of a valid visa or a residence permit of any member state of the Schengen Area, Canada, Cyprus, Ireland, the United Kingdom or the United States may enter the Dominican Republic without a visa.
Ecuador	eVisa	90 days	
Egypt	Visa required		
El Salvador	eVisa		
Equatorial Guinea	eVisa		
Eritrea	Visa required		
Estonia	Visa required		
Eswatini	Visa required		
Ethiopia	eVisa / Visa on arrival	90 days	e-Visa holders must arrive via Addis Ababa Bole International Airport.
Fiji	Visa required		
Finland	Visa required		
France	Visa required		
Gabon	eVisa		Electronic visa holders must arrive via Libreville International Airport.
Gambia	Visa not required		
Georgia	Visa required		Visa is not required for up to 90 days if holding a valid visa or residency permit from EEA Member State, Australia, Bermuda, Canada, GCC member state, Japan, Korea (Rep.), New Zealand, Switzerland, USA or United Kingdom
Germany	Visa required		
Ghana	Visa on arrival	30 days	
Greece	Visa required		
Grenada	Visa required		
Guatemala	Visa required		
Guinea	eVisa	90 days	
Guinea-Bissau	Visa on arrival	90 days	
Guyana	Visa required		
Haiti	Visa not required	3 months	
Honduras	Visa required		
Hungary	Visa required		
Iceland	Visa required		
India	Visa required		
Indonesia	Visa required		Somali citizens are subject to the calling visa category, a designation applied to nationals considered to have specific vulnerabilities or risks related to ideology, politics, economy, society, culture, security, or immigration.; Prior approval from the Directorate General of Immigration in Jakarta is required before applying for a visa.; In addition to holding a visa, travelers must obtain a reference letter from the Directorate General of Immigration and present the invitation letter submitted with their visa application before traveling to Indonesia.
Iran	Visa required		
Iraq	eVisa	30 days	
Ireland	Visa required		
Israel	Visa required		Confirmation from Israeli Foreign Ministry is required before a visa is issued.
Italy	Visa required		
Jamaica	Visa required		
Japan	Visa required		Eligible for an e-Visa if residing in one these countries: Australia, Brazil, Cambodia, Canada, India, Saudi Arabia, Singapore, South Africa, Taiwan, United Arab Emirates, United Kingdom, United States.
Jordan	Visa required		
Kazakhstan	Visa required		
Kenya	Visa not required	90 days	Applications can be submitted up to 90 days prior to travel and must be submitted at least 3 days in advance.; eTA fee is 32.50 USD.; Proof of reservation at the hotel where visitors plan to stay is required (if staying with friends, an invitation letter is also acceptable).; Yellow fever vaccination certificate is required if coming from endemic countries.
Kiribati	Visa required		
North Korea	Visa required		
South Korea	Visa required		Multiple-entry visa may be granted to Palestinians who entered South Korea 4 or more times within the last 2 years, or 10 or more visits in total (one of those 10 visits should be within the last 2 years).; May apply online
Kuwait	Visa required		e-Visa can be obtained for holders of a Residence Permit issued by a GCC member state under the following conditions: To be 18 years old and over.; The residence permit for a GCC state must be valid for at least another 3 months.; To be accompanied by the sponsor of the residence permit if the sponsor is an individual.; Does not apply to holders of a GCC Student Visa and Non-Skilled Worker Visa
Kyrgyzstan	eVisa		
Laos	eVisa / Visa on arrival	30 days	18 (Note: Savannakhet Airport; Lanetoui - Mengkang (China); Meuangmom - Wan Pong (Myanmar); Banvang - Ban Khok Phai (Thailand); Namngeun - Huay Kon (Thailand); Paksan - Bueng Kan (Thailand); Paktaphan - Pak Saeng (Thailand); Pangmon - Ban Huak (Thailand); Phoudou (Thailand); Dak ta ock - Nam Giang (Vietnam); La Lai (Vietnam); Namkan (Vietnam); Namphao - Cau Treo (Vietnam); Namsoy - Na Meo (Vietnam); Naphao - Cha Lo (Vietnam); Pahang - Long Sap (Vietnam); Panghok - Tây Trang (Vietnam); Phoukeua - Bo Y (Vietnam)) of the 33 border crossings are only open to regular visa holders.; e-Visa may be used to enter Laos through the Luang Prabang, Pakse and Vientiane international airports, 3 Thai-Lao Friendship Bridges (Note: Vientiane (Friendship Bridge 1); Savannakhet (Friendship Bridge 2); Bokeo (Friendship Bridge 4)), in Boten (road and railroad), and in Vientiane (at Khamsavath railway station).; Visa on arrival is available at the Luang Prabang, Pakse and Vientiane international airports, 4 Thai-Lao Friendship Bridges (Note: Vientiane (Friendship Bridge 1); Savannakhet (Friendship Bridge 2); Khammouane (Friendship Bridge 3); Bokeo (Friendship Bridge 4)) and 7 border crossings. (Note: Nongnokkheane - Trapeang Kriel (Cambodia); Boten - Bo han (China); Golden Triangle/Samliemkham (Thailand); Khamsavath railway station (Thailand); Namheuang - Ban Na Kraseng (Thailand); Vang tao - Chongmek (Thailand); Dansavan - Lao Bảo (Vietnam))
Latvia	Visa required		
Lebanon	Visa on arrival	30 days	
Lesotho	eVisa	14 days	
Liberia	eVisa		
Libya	eVisa	30 days	
Liechtenstein	Visa required		
Lithuania	Visa required		
Luxembourg	Visa required		
Madagascar	eVisa / Visa on arrival	90 days	
Malawi	eVisa	30 days	
Malaysia	Visa not required	30 days	
Maldives	Free visa on arrival	30 days	
Mali	Visa required		
Malta	Visa required		
Marshall Islands	Visa required		
Mauritania	eVisa		
Mauritius	Visa required		
Mexico	Visa required		Visa is not required for Holders of a valid visa of Canada, US, UK or a Schengen State and permanent residence of Canada, Chile, Colombia, Schengen State, Japan, UK, US; Entry may be refused by immigration officials for individuals who were previously denied a US visa, even if holding a valid Mexican visa.
Micronesia	Visa not required	30 days	
Moldova	eVisa		Visa not required if holding a valid visa/residence permit that is issued by a European Union member state or one in the Schengen Area, Canada, Ireland, UK, US
Monaco	Visa required		
Mongolia	Visa required		
Montenegro	Visa required		Visa not required for holders of a valid Australia, Japan, Canada, New Zealand, Ireland, US, UK or a Schengen Visa.; Holders of residence permit in the United Arab Emirates may enter, in Montenegro for a duration of 10 days
Morocco	Visa required		May apply for an e-Visa if holding a valid visa or a residency document issued by one of the following countries: Schengen Area, Australia, Canada, Ireland, New Zealand, United Kingdom, United States, Cyprus, Japan, United Arab Emirates.
Mozambique	eVisa		
Myanmar	Visa required		
Namibia	eVisa		
Nauru	Visa required		
Nepal	Visa required		
Netherlands	Visa required		
New Zealand	Admission restricted		Holders of Somali passports are de facto excluded from New Zealand, as there is no authority in Somalia that is recognised by the New Zealand Government as being competent to issue passports on behalf of Somalia, and New Zealand immigration authorities will therefore not endorse visas in Somali passports. Somali citizens may travel on a New Zealand Certificate of Identity, or the passport of another country.
Nicaragua	Visa required		Visa on arrival if holding valid visa issued by United States, Canada, or Schengen member state
Niger	Visa required		
Nigeria	eVisa	90 days	
North Macedonia	Visa required		Visa is not required for stays up to 15 days if holding a valid multiple entry visa of Canada, the United States, United Kingdom, Schengen Area member state, or residence permit of Schengen Area member
Norway	Visa required		
Oman	eVisa		Holders of a GCC state resident permit can get a 28 days visa on arrival that costs 5 Omani Riyals.
Pakistan	Visa required		
Palau	Free visa on arrival	30 days	
Panama	Visa required		Visa is not required for holders of a multiple-entry visa valid for at least 6 months at the time of entry or permanent residency issued by Australia, Canada, European Union, Japan, Singapore, South Korea, US, UK.
Papua New Guinea	eVisa	60 days	May apply for an e-visa under the type of "Tourist - Own Itinerary".
Paraguay	Visa required		
Peru	Visa required		
Philippines	Visa required		Residents of the United Arab Emirates may obtain an eVisa through the official Philippine eVisa website. A valid Emirati residence visa must be shown upon an eVisa application.
Poland	Visa required		
Portugal	Visa required		
Qatar	eVisa	30 days	
Romania	Visa required		
Russia	Visa required		
Rwanda	Visa not required	90 days	
Saint Kitts and Nevis	eVisa		
Saint Lucia	Visa required		
Saint Vincent and the Grenadines	Visa not required	1 month	
Samoa	Visa not required	60 days	
San Marino	Visa required		
São Tomé and Príncipe	eVisa		Visa is obtained online.
Saudi Arabia	Visa required		Tourist visa on arrival for holders of a valid multiple entry visa from US, UK or Schengen area, under the condition that the multiple entry visa has been used at least once, proving that by showing the entry and exit stamps of the country of issuance.
Senegal	Visa required		
Serbia	Visa required		
Seychelles	Free Visitor's Permit on arrival	3 months	
Sierra Leone	eVisa		
Singapore	eVisa		Conditions applies or if a regular advanced visa
Slovakia	Visa required		
Slovenia	Visa required		
Solomon Islands	Visa required		
South Africa	Visa required		
South Sudan	eVisa		Obtainable online; Printed visa authorization must be presented at the time of travel
Spain	Visa required		
Sri Lanka	ETA / Visa on arrival	30 days	Electronic Travel Authorization can also be obtained on arrival.; 30 days extendable to 6 months.
Sudan	Visa required		
Suriname	eVisa		
Sweden	Visa required		
Switzerland	Visa required		
Syria	eVisa		
Tajikistan	Visa required		
Tanzania	eVisa		
Thailand	eVisa		
Timor-Leste	Visa on arrival	30 days	At Presidente Nicolau Lobato International Airport or the Dili Sea Port only.
Togo	eVisa	15 days	
Tonga	Visa required		
Trinidad and Tobago	Visa required		
Tunisia	Visa required		
Turkey	Visa required	30 days	
Turkmenistan	Visa required		
Tuvalu	Visa on arrival	1 month	
Uganda	eVisa	3 months	May apply online.
Ukraine	Visa required		
United Arab Emirates	eVisa	30 days	May apply online.; May apply also using 'Smart service'.
United Kingdom and Crown dependencies	Visa required		
United States	Visa restricted		Effective June 9, 2025, U.S. visas will no longer be issued to citizens of 12 countries, with certain exemptions.
Uruguay	Visa required		
Uzbekistan	Visa required		
Vanuatu	Visa required		
Vatican City	Visa required		Open borders but de facto follows Italian visa policy.
Venezuela	eVisa		Introduction of Electronic Visa System for Tourist and Business Travelers.
Vietnam	eVisa	90 days	Visa free for 30 days when visiting Phú Quốc
Yemen	Visa required		
Zambia	eVisa	90 days	
Zimbabwe	eVisa	90 days	

== Dependent, Disputed, or Restricted territories ==
Unrecognized or partially recognized countries

Territory	Conditions of access	Notes
Abkhazia	Visa required	
Kosovo	Visa required	Do not need a visa a holder of a valid biometric residence permit issued by one of the Schengen member states or a valid multi-entry Schengen Visa, a holder of a valid Laissez-Passer issued by United Nations Organizations, NATO, OSCE, Council of Europe or European Union a holder of a valid travel documents issued by EU Member and Schengen States, United States of America, Canada, Australia and Japan based on the 1951 Convention on Refugee Status or the 1954 Convention on the Status of Stateless Persons, as well as holders of valid travel documents for foreigners (max. 15 days stay)
Northern Cyprus	Visa not required	
Palestine	Visa not required	Arrival by sea to Gaza Strip not allowed.
Sahrawi Arab Democratic Republic		Undefined visa regime in the Western Sahara controlled territory.
Somaliland	Visa on arrival	
South Ossetia	Visa not required	Multiple entry visa to Russia and three day prior notification are required to enter South Ossetia.
Taiwan	Visa required	Somali citizens are subject to special visa requirements and may only visit Taiwan under specific conditions, including official invitations, business activities, medical treatment, family visits, or participation in approved events.; Those visiting Taiwan on business must be interviewed by a Taiwanese consular officer, and their sponsors must submit a letter of guarantee to the Bureau of Consular Affairs in Taiwan.
Transnistria	Visa not required	Registration required after 24h.

Dependent and autonomous territories

Territory	Conditions of access	Notes
China
Hong Kong	eVisa	
Macau	Visa on arrival	
Denmark
Faroe Islands	Visa required	
Greenland	Visa required	
France
French Guiana	Visa required	
French Polynesia	Visa required	
(France) French West Indies	Visa required	Includes overseas departments of Guadeloupe and Martinique and overseas collectivities of Saint Barthélemy and Saint Martin.
Mayotte	Visa required	
New Caledonia	Visa required	
Réunion	Visa required	
Saint Pierre and Miquelon	Visa required	
Wallis and Futuna	Visa required	
Netherlands
Aruba	Visa required	
Caribbean Netherlands	Visa required	Includes Bonaire, Sint Eustatius and (Saba (island)) Saba.
Curaçao	Visa required	
Sint Maarten	Visa required	
New Zealand
Cook Islands	Visa not required	31 days
Niue	Visa not required	30 days
Tokelau	Visa required	
United Kingdom
Akrotiri and Dhekelia	Visa required	
Anguilla	Visa required	Holders of a valid visa issued by the United Kingdom do not require a visa.
Bermuda	Visa required	
British Indian Ocean Territory	Special permit required	Special permit required.
British Virgin Islands	Visa required	
Cayman Islands	Visa required	
Falkland Islands	Visa required	
Gibraltar	Visa required	
Montserrat	eVisa	
Pitcairn Islands	Visa not required	14 days visa free and landing fee 35 USD or tax of 5 USD if not going ashore.
Ascension Island	eVisa	3 months within any year period
Saint Helena	eVisa	
Tristan da Cunha	Permission required	Permission to land required for 15/30 pounds sterling (yacht/ship passenger) for Tristan da Cunha Island or 20 pounds sterling for Gough Island, Inaccessible Island or Nightingale Islands.
South Georgia and the South Sandwich Islands	Permit required	Pre-arrival permit from the Commissioner required (72 hours/1 month for 110/160 pounds sterling).
Turks and Caicos Islands	Visa required	Holders of a valid visa issued by Canada, United Kingdom or the USA do not required a visa for a maximum stay of 90 days.
United States
American Samoa	Visa required	
Guam	Visa required	
Northern Mariana Islands	Visa required	
Puerto Rico	Visa required	
U.S. Virgin Islands	Visa required	
Antarctica and adjacent islands
Special permits required for Bouvet Island, British Antarctic Territory, French Southern and Antarctic Lands, Argentine Antarctica, (Australia) Australian Antarctic Territory, (Antártica Chilena Province) Chilean Antarctic Territory, (Australia) Heard Island and McDonald Islands, (Norway) Peter I Island, (Norway) Queen Maud Land, (New Zealand) Ross Dependency.

== Vaccination ==
Many African countries, including Angola, Benin, Burkina Faso, Cameroon, Central African Republic, Chad, Democratic Republic of the Congo, Republic of the Congo, Côte d'Ivoire, Equatorial Guinea, Gabon, Ghana, Guinea, Liberia, Mali, Mauritania, Niger, Rwanda, São Tomé and Príncipe, Senegal, Sierra Leone, Uganda, Zambia require all incoming passengers to have a current International Certificate of Vaccination. Some other countries require vaccination only if the passenger is coming from an infected area.

== Passport validity ==
Many countries require passport validity of no less than 6 months and one or two blank pages.

== See also ==
- Visa policy of Somalia
- Somali passport
- List of nationalities forbidden at border
