= Visa requirements for Algerian citizens =

Administrative entry restrictions

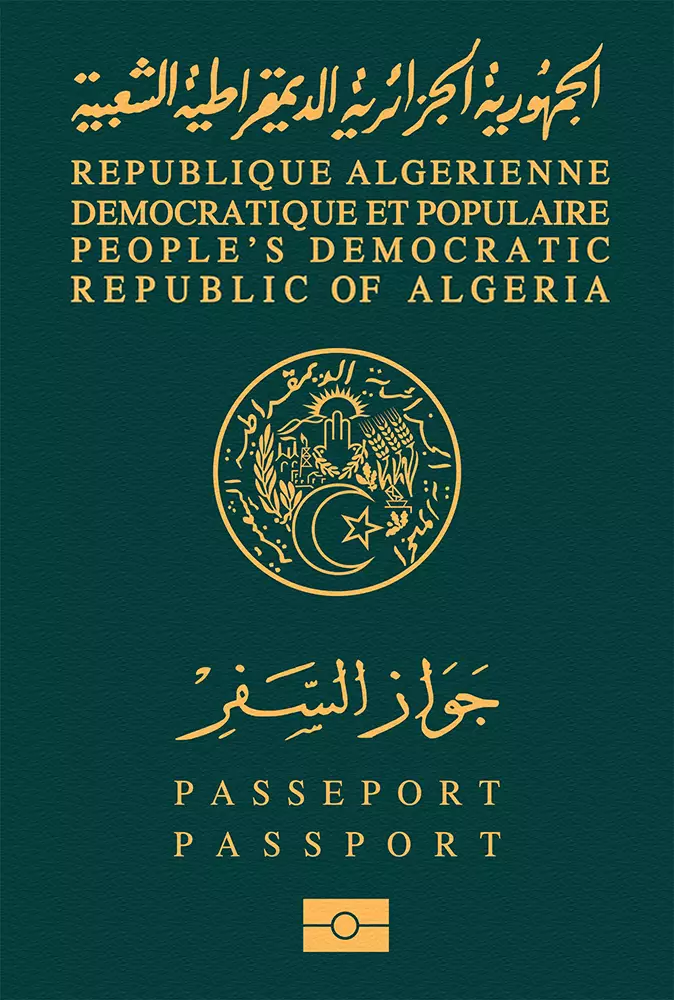
Algerian biometric passport

Visa requirements for Algerian citizens are administrative entry restrictions by the authorities of other states placed on citizens of Algeria.

As of 2026, Algerian citizens had visa-free or visa on arrival access to 55 countries and territories, ranking the Algerian passport 77th in the world according to the Henley Passport Index.

== Visa requirements map ==
Visa requirements for Algerian citizens holding ordinary passports Algeria Visa not required/eTA Visa on arrival eVisa Visa available both on arrival or online Visa required

== Visa requirements ==
Country	Visa requirement	Allowed stay	Notes (excluding departure fees)	Reciprocity
Afghanistan	eVisa		Visa is only approved if issued by a diplomatic mission approved by the Taliban; Visa is not required in case born in Afghanistan or can proof that one of their parents is a national of Afghanistan or born in Afghanistan.; e-Visa : Visitors must arrive at Kabul International (KBL).	✓
Albania	eVisa		Visa is not required for Holders of a valid multiple-entry Schengen, UK or US visa has been previously used once or residence permit of Schengen, UK, US or UAE 10 years.	X
Andorra	Visa required			✓
Angola	Visa not required	30 days	Up to three visa-free entries per calendar year, for a duration of 30 days each.	X
Antigua and Barbuda	eVisa		Algerians with a visa or residency issued by Canada, USA, United Kingdom or a Schengen Member State can obtain a visa upon arrival that costs USD100 for a maximum of 30 days.	X
Argentina	Visa required			✓
Armenia	eVisa	120 days	Visa on arrival if holding a valid residence permit or valid visa issued by the EU and Schengen member states, the USA, Australia, New Zealand, the Republic of Korea, the UK, Canada, the Russian Federation, or Japan or a valid residence permit (physical card or sticker) issued by the GCC member states.	✓
Australia and territories	Visa required		May apply online (Online Visitor e600 visa).	X
Austria	Visa required			✓
Azerbaijan	eVisa	30 days	Algerians are eligible to obtain a 30-day tourist Visa on Arrival if holding a residence permit issued by one of GCC state members. They must present their valid visa or residence permit along with their passport.	✓
Bahamas	eVisa			✓
Bahrain	eVisa / Visa on arrival	14 days		✓
Bangladesh	Visa required			✓
Barbados	Visa not required	90 days		✓
Belarus	Visa required			✓
Belgium	Visa required			✓
Belize	Visa required			✓
Benin	Visa not required	90 days		X
Bhutan	eVisa	90 days	Visa fee is 40 USD per person and visa application may be processed within 5 business days with duration of stay of 90 days.; e-Visa applicant is also subject to pay Sustainable Development Fee	X
Bolivia	eVisa / Visa on arrival	30 days		X
Bosnia and Herzegovina	Visa required			✓
Botswana	eVisa	3 months		X
Brazil	Visa required			✓
Brunei	Visa required			✓
Bulgaria	Visa required			✓
Burkina Faso	eVisa			X
Burundi	Visa on arrival	1 month		X
Cambodia	eVisa / Visa on arrival	30 days		X
Cameroon	eVisa			X
Canada	Visa required		US permanent residents (Green card) holders can enter visa free	✓
Cape Verde	Visa on arrival	30 days	Visa on arrival at Sal, Boa Vista, São Vicente or Santiago international airports.; Requirement to register online five days before arrival; Also pay the airport security fee of CVE 3400 either online or on arrival.	X
Central African Republic	Visa required			✓
Chad	eVisa			✓
Chile	Visa required			✓
China	Visa required			✓
Colombia	eVisa			X
Comoros	Visa on arrival	45 days		X
Republic of the Congo	Visa required			✓
Democratic Republic of the Congo	eVisa	7 days		X
Costa Rica	Visa required		Holders of a valid multiple-entry visa of any member state of the Schengen Area, Canada, or the United States may enter Cost Rica without a visa for maximum stay of 30 days	✓
Côte d'Ivoire	eVisa	3 months		X
Croatia	Visa required			✓
Cuba	eVisa	90 days	Can be extended up to 90 days with a fee.	X
Cyprus	Visa required			✓
Czech Republic	Visa required			✓
Denmark	Visa required			✓
Djibouti	eVisa	90 days		X
Dominica	Visa not required	21 days		X
Dominican Republic	Visa required		Visa not required for Algerians with a valid multiple entrance schengen visa for a maximum stay of 180 days.	✓
Ecuador	Visa not required	90 days		X
Egypt	Visa required		Visa not required for Algerian citizens under the age of 14.	✓
El Salvador	Visa required			✓
Equatorial Guinea	eVisa			X
Eritrea	Visa required			✓
Estonia	Visa required			✓
Eswatini	Visa required			✓
Ethiopia	eVisa / Visa on arrival	up to 90 days	Visa on arrival is obtainable only at Addis Ababa Bole International Airport.; e-Visa holders must arrive via Addis Ababa Bole International Airport.; e-Visa is available for 30 or 90 days.	X
Fiji	eVisa			✓
Finland	Visa required			✓
France	Visa required			✓
Gabon	eVisa	90 days	e-Visa holders must arrive via Libreville International Airport.	X
Gambia	Visa not required	90 days		X
Georgia	eVisa	30 days		X
Germany	Visa required			✓
Ghana	Visa on arrival	30 days		X
Greece	Visa required			✓
Grenada	Visa required			✓
Guatemala	Visa required		Visa is not required up to 90 days if holding a valid residence permit issued by Australia, Canada, GCC member state the United States the United Kingdom or a Schengen Area Member State.	✓
Guinea	Visa not required			X
Guinea-Bissau	Visa on arrival	90 days		X
Guyana	Visa required			✓
Haiti	Visa not required	3 months		X
Honduras	Visa required		Visa is not required if holding a valid visa for at least 6 months at the time of arrival, issued by Canada, the United States or a Schengen Area Member State.	✓
Hungary	Visa required			✓
Iceland	Visa required			✓
India	Visa required			✓
Indonesia	Visa required			✓
Iran	eVisa / Visa on arrival	30 days		X
Iraq	eVisa	30 days		✓
Ireland	Visa required			✓
Israel	Visa required			
Italy	Visa required			✓
Jamaica	Visa required			✓
Japan	Visa required		Eligible for an e-Visa if residing in one these countries Australia, Brazil, Cambodia, Canada, India, Saudi Arabia, Singapore, South Africa, Taiwan, United Arab Emirates, United Kingdom, United States.; May apply online	✓
Jordan	eVisa / Visa on arrival	30 days	Free of charge.	X
Kazakhstan	eVisa			X
Kenya	Visa not required	90 days		X
Kiribati	Visa required			✓
North Korea	Visa required			✓
South Korea	Visa required		Visa-Free access to Jeju Island for 30 days.; Multiple-Entry Visa may be granted to whom entered South Korea four or more times within the last two years, or 10 or more visits in total (one of those 10 visits should be within the last two years).; May apply online	✓
Kuwait	Visa required		e-Visa can be obtained for holders of a Residence Permit issued by a GCC member state under the following conditions: To be 18 years old and over.; The residence permit for a GCC state must be valid for at least another 3 months.; To be accompanied by the sponsor of the residence permit if the sponsor is an individual.; Does not apply to holders of a GCC Student Visa and Non-Skilled Worker Visa	✓
Kyrgyzstan	eVisa	60 days		X
Laos	Visa required			✓
Latvia	Visa required			✓
Lebanon	Visa on arrival	30 days	Visa on arrival at Beirut International Airport or any other port of entry only if they are holding a copy of a reservation in a 3- to 5-star hotel or private residential address with telephone number in the Republic of Lebanon, at least US$2,000 in cash, a non-refundable return or circle trip ticket, and there are no Israeli stamps, visas, or seals on their passport.	X
Lesotho	eVisa	14 days		X
Liberia	eVisa			✓
Libya	Visa not required			✓
Liechtenstein	Visa required			✓
Lithuania	Visa required			✓
Luxembourg	Visa required			✓
Madagascar	eVisa / Visa on arrival	60 days		X
Malawi	eVisa	90 days		X
Malaysia	Visa not required	3 months		✓
Maldives	Free visa on arrival	30 days		X
Mali	Visa not required	3 months		✓
Malta	Visa required			✓
Marshall Islands	Visa required			✓
Mauritania	Visa not required			✓
Mauritius	Visa on arrival	15 days		✓
Mexico	Visa required		Algerians traveling to Mexico for tourism, business or in transit to another destination, are exempt from presenting a Mexican visa as long as they have a valid visa issued by any the following countries: Canada, Japan, the United States of America, the United Kingdom or any of the countries comprising the Schengen Area for a maximum stay of 180 days.; Algerians who have a valid permanent resident card from Canada, Japan, the United States of America, the United Kingdom or any of the countries comprising the Schengen Area, do not require a Mexican visa.; Algerian visitors who travel on cruise ships that disembark at any Mexican port to visit the port and surrounding zones and embark on the same ship to continue their voyage, do not require a visa and will have collective permission under the category of “visitor without permission to conduct remunerated activities”, for a period of 21 calendar days.	✓
Micronesia	Visa not required	30 days		X
Moldova	eVisa		visa not required if holding a valid visa /residence permit that is issued by a European Union member state or Schengen Area, Canada, Ireland, UK, US	X
Monaco	Visa required			✓
Mongolia	Visa required			✓
Montenegro	Visa required			✓
Morocco	Visa not required	90 days		✓
Mozambique	eVisa / Visa on arrival	30 days		X
Myanmar	eVisa	28 days		X
Namibia	eVisa			✓
Nauru	Visa required			✓
Nepal	eVisa/ Visa on arrival	90 days		X
Netherlands	Visa required			✓
New Zealand	Visa required		Holders of an Australian Permanent Resident Visa or Resident Return Visa may be granted a New Zealand Resident Visa on arrival permitting indefinite stay (pursuant to the Trans-Tasman Travel Arrangement), subject to meeting character requirements and obtaining an Electronic Travel Authority prior to departure.	✓
Nicaragua	Visa not required	90 days		X
Niger	Visa required			✓
Nigeria	eVisa	90 days		✓
North Macedonia	Visa required		Visa is not required for stays upto 15 days if holding a valid multiple entry visa of Canada, the United States, United Kingdom, Schengen Area member state, or residence permit of Schengen Area member state.	✓
Norway	Visa required			✓
Oman	Visa required		For a visa exemption, citizens of Algeria are required to be either residents or have a valid entry visa for one of the following countries (the United States of America, Canada, Australia, The United Kingdom, Schengen Agreement countries, Japan), or to be residents of one of the countries of The GCC countries and its profession are among the professions that benefit from the resident visa.	✓
Pakistan	eVisa	30 days / 3 months	Online Visa eligible.; Issued in 7-10 business days.	X
Palau	Visa on arrival	30 days		X
Panama	Visa required		Visa is not required for holders of a multiple-entry visa valid for at least 6 months at the time of entry or permanent residency issued by Australia, Canada, European Union, Japan, Singapore, South Korea, US, UK.	✓
Papua New Guinea	eVisa	60 days	Visitors may apply for a visa online under the "Tourist - Own Itinerary" category.	X
Paraguay	Visa required			✓
Peru	Visa required			✓
Philippines	Visa required		Residents of the United Arab Emirates may obtain an eVisa through the official Philippine eVisa website. A valid Emirati residence visa must be shown upon an eVisa application.	✓
Poland	Visa required			✓
Portugal	Visa required			✓
Qatar	eVisa			X
Romania	Visa required			✓
Russia	Visa required			✓
Rwanda	Visa not required	30 days		X
Saint Kitts and Nevis	eVisa			X
Saint Lucia	Visa required			✓
Saint Vincent and the Grenadines	Visa not required	3 months		X
Samoa	Visa not required	60 days		X
San Marino	Visa required			✓
São Tomé and Príncipe	eVisa			X
Saudi Arabia	Visa required		Tourist visa on arrival for holders of a valid multiple entry visa from US, UK or Schengen area, under the condition that the multiple entry visa has been used at least once, proving that by showing the entry and exit stamps of the country of issuance.	✓
Senegal	Visa on arrival	90 days		X
Serbia	Visa required		90 days for visa holders or residents of the European Union member states and the United States.	✓
Seychelles	ETA required	3 months	Application can be submitted up to 30 days before travel.; Visitors must upload a reservation confirmation(s) for each visitor's location of stay in Seychelles.; Yellow fever vaccination certificate is required if coming from endemic countries.; Payment of the fee (EUR 10) by credit or debit card.; Valid for one journey only and it expires once exit the country.	✓
Sierra Leone	eVisa	3 months		✓
Singapore	Visa required		Visa application can be submitted online using the 'e-Service' through a strategic partner or a local contact in Singapore.	✓
Slovakia	Visa required			✓
Slovenia	Visa required			✓
Solomon Islands	Visa required			✓
Somalia	eVisa	30 days		X
South Africa	Electronic Travel Authorization	90 days		X
South Sudan	eVisa		Obtainable online.; Printed visa authorization must be presented at the time of travel.	X
Spain	Visa required			✓
Sri Lanka	Electronic Travel Authorization	60 days / 30 days	Sri Lanka introduced an ETA valid for 30 days.	X
Sudan	Visa required			✓
Suriname	Visa not required	90 days	An entrance fee of USD 50 or EUR 50 must be paid online prior to arrival.; Multiple entry e-Visa is also available.	X
Sweden	Visa required			✓
Switzerland	Visa required			✓
Syria	Visa not required		According to the Law No. 2 of 2014 all visitors require visas prior to arrival.	✓
Tajikistan	eVisa / Visa on arrival	60 days	e-Visa holders can enter through all border points.	X
Tanzania	eVisa / Visa on arrival	90 days		X
Thailand	eVisa	60 days		✓
Timor-Leste	Visa on arrival	30 days		X
Togo	eVisa	15 days		X
Tonga	Visa required			✓
Trinidad and Tobago	eVisa			✓
Tunisia	Visa not required	90 days		✓
Turkey	Visa required		Official passport holders are exempted from visa for their travels up to 90 days. Ordinary passport holder Algerian citizens, under the age of 15 and above the age of 50 are exempted from visa up to 90 days within any 180 day period for their touristic visits. Ordinary passport holders between the age of 15 and 50 are required to have visa. Ordinary passport holder Algerian citiziens between the ages of 15-18 and 35-50 with a valid Schengen members or USA, UK, Ireland visa or residence permit may get their one month period single entry e-Visas via the website www.evisa.gov.tr..	✓
Turkmenistan	Visa required			✓
Tuvalu	Visa on arrival	1 month		X
Uganda	eVisa	3 months		X
Ukraine	Visa required			✓
United Arab Emirates	Visa required		May apply using 'Smart service'.	✓
United Kingdom and Crown dependencies	Visa required			✓
United States and territories	Visa required			✓
Uruguay	Visa required			✓
Uzbekistan	eVisa	30 days	5-day visa-free transit at the international airports if holding a confirmed onward ticket for a flight to a third country.	X
Vanuatu	eVisa			✓
Vatican City	Visa required			✓
Venezuela	eVisa		Introduction of Electronic Visa System for Tourist and Business Travelers.	✓
Vietnam	eVisa		e-Visa is valid for 90 days and multiple entry.	✓
Yemen	Visa on arrival	1 month		X
Zambia	eVisa	90 days		X
Zimbabwe	eVisa / Visa on arrival	3 months		X

== Dependent, disputed, or restricted territories ==
Unrecognized or partially recognized countries

Territory	Conditions of access	Notes
Abkhazia	Visa required	
Kosovo	Visa required	Do not need a visa a holder of a valid biometric residence permit issued by one of the Schengen member states or a valid multi-entry Schengen Visa, a holder of a valid Laissez-Passer issued by United Nations Organizations, NATO, OSCE, Council of Europe or European Union a holder of a valid travel documents issued by EU Member and Schengen States, United States of America, Canada, Australia and Japan based on the 1951 Convention on Refugee Status or the 1954 Convention on the Status of Stateless Persons, as well as holders of valid travel documents for foreigners (max. 15 days' stay)
Northern Cyprus	Visa required	
Palestine	Visa not required	Arrival by sea to the Gaza Strip not allowed.
Sahrawi Arab Democratic Republic		Undefined visa regime in the Western Sahara controlled territory.
Somaliland	Visa on arrival	30 days for 30 USD, payable on arrival.
South Ossetia	Visa not required	Multiple entry visa to Russia and three-day prior notification are required to enter South Ossetia.
Taiwan	Visa required	Algerian citizens are subject to special visa requirements and may only visit Taiwan under specific conditions, including official invitations, business activities, medical treatment, family visits, or participation in approved events.; Those visiting Taiwan on business must be interviewed by a Taiwanese consular officer, and their sponsors must submit a letter of guarantee to the Bureau of Consular Affairs in Taiwan.
Transnistria	Visa not required	Registration required after 24h.

Dependent and autonomous territories

Territory	Conditions of access	Notes
China
Hong Kong	Visa not required	14 days
Macau	Visa on arrival	
Denmark
Faroe Islands	Visa required	
Greenland	Visa required	
France
French Guiana	Visa required	
French Polynesia	Visa required	
(France) French West Indies	Visa required	Includes overseas departments of Guadeloupe and Martinique and overseas collectivities of Saint Barthélemy and Saint Martin.
Mayotte	Visa required	
New Caledonia	Visa required	
Réunion	Visa required	
Saint Pierre and Miquelon	Visa required	
Wallis and Futuna	Visa required	
Netherlands
Aruba	Visa required	
Caribbean Netherlands	Visa required	Includes Bonaire, Sint Eustatius and Saba.
Curaçao	Visa required	
Sint Maarten	Visa required	
New Zealand
Cook Islands	Visa not required	31 days
Niue	Visa not required	30 days
Tokelau	Visa required	
United Kingdom
Akrotiri and Dhekelia	Visa required	
Anguilla	Visa required	Holders of a valid visa issued by the United Kingdom do not require a visa.
Bermuda	Visa required	
British Indian Ocean Territory	Special permit required	Special permit required.
British Virgin Islands	Visa required	
Cayman Islands	Visa required	
Falkland Islands	Visa required	
Gibraltar	Visa required	
Montserrat	eVisa	
Pitcairn Islands	Visa not required	14 days visa free and landing fee 35 USD or tax of 5 USD if not going ashore.
Ascension Island	eVisa	3 months within any year period.
Saint Helena	eVisa	
Tristan da Cunha	Permission required	Permission to land required for 15/30 pounds sterling (yacht/ship passenger) for Tristan da Cunha Island or 20 pounds sterling for Gough Island, Inaccessible Island or Nightingale Islands.
South Georgia and the South Sandwich Islands	Permit required	Pre-arrival permit from the Commissioner required (72 hours/1 month for 110/160 pounds sterling).
Turks and Caicos Islands	Visa required	Holders of a valid visa issued by Canada, United Kingdom or the USA do not required a visa for a maximum stay of 90 days.
United States
American Samoa	Visa required	
Guam	Visa required	
Northern Mariana Islands	Visa required	
Puerto Rico	Visa required	
U.S. Virgin Islands	Visa required	
Antarctica and adjacent islands
Special permits required for Bouvet Island, British Antarctic Territory, French Southern and Antarctic Lands, Argentine Antarctica, (Australia) Australian Antarctic Territory, (Antártica Chilena Province) Chilean Antarctic Territory, (Australia) Heard Island and McDonald Islands, (Norway) Peter I Island, (Norway) Queen Maud Land, (New Zealand) Ross Dependency.

== See also ==
- Visa policy of Algeria
- Algerian passport
