= Algerian passport =

Passport issued to citizens of Algeria

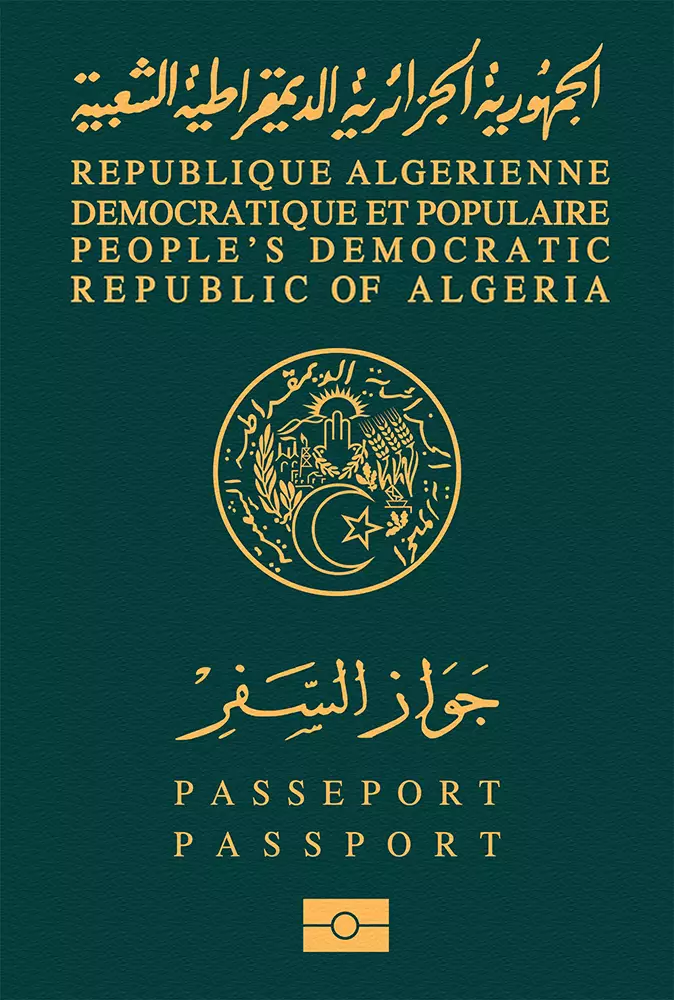
- Front cover of the current Algerian passport (with chip), issued since January 2012
- Type: Passport
- Issued by: Algeria
- First issued: 2012 (current biometric passport)
- Purpose: Identification
- Valid in: All countries
- Eligibility: Algerian citizenship
- Expiration: 10 years (Adult/+19 years); 5 years (Minor/-19 years)
- Cost: 6,000 DZD (USD44)
- Website: passeport.interieur,gov.dz

The Algerian passport (Arabic: جواز السفر الجزائري) is an international travel document issued to citizens of Algeria and may also serve as proof of Algerian citizenship. Besides enabling the bearer to travel internationally and serving as indication of Algerian citizenship, the passport facilitates the process of securing assistance from Algerian consular officials abroad.

The passport costs 6,000 DZD (USD44) and is valid for 10 years.

Visa requirements for Algerian citizens holding ordinary passports Algeria Visa not required/eTA Visa on arrival eVisa Visa available both on arrival or online Visa required

== Biometric passport ==
Biometric passports started to be issued on January 5, 2012.

Algerian citizens have visa-free or visa on arrival access to 50 countries and territories, ranking it 91st in the world according to the Henley Passport Index Q1 2022. It is also ranked 50th, out of 67th, according to the Arton Capital's Passport Index.

=== Physical appearance ===
The data page of the passport is from rigid polycarbonate plastic and contains a microchip embedded in which are stored biometric data of the holder including fingerprints, photo and signature. The data is extracted from the chip with wireless RFID technology.

The photo on the page can be scanned and is replied by side and it is UV reactive. It has an alphanumeric code at the bottom of the data page which is machine-readable with optical scanners. The code includes microprinting, holographic images, images visible only with UV light, filigree and other details.

The data is written in Arabic, English and French.

== Types of passports ==
=== Regular passport ===
Biometric passports, which have a green cover, are issued to all Algerian citizens and are valid for 10 years after issuance or 5 years for minors' passports.

=== Emergency passport ===
Emergency passports, which also have a green cover, are issued to Algerian citizens who don't have a regular passport and need to travel abroad urgently and dont' have time to apply for a regular passport. They can be issued by the Ministry of Foreign Affairs or an Algerian embassy or consulate abroad and if the holder applies for a regular passport, they must surrender the emergency passport. They last between 3 and 12 months.

=== Diplomatic passport ===
Diplomatic passports, which have a red cover, are issued to Algerians diplomats and ambassadors abroad and Algerians travelling abroad for diplomatic work even if they are not a diplomat. They are usually valid for 10 years.

=== Service passport ===
Service passports are issued to Algerian officials travelling abroad, including high-ranking military personnel.

== See also ==
- Visa requirements for Algerian citizens
