= Somali passport =

Passport issued to citizens of Somalia

Somali ePassport
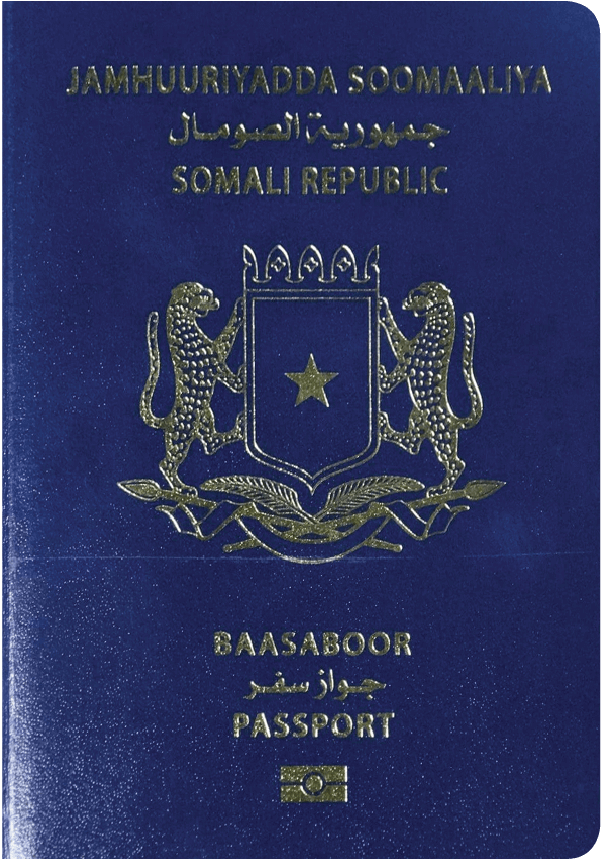
- Passport of Somalia
- Type: Passport
- Issued by: Somalia
- First issued: 1960 (First edition); 28 February 2007 (Current biometric version)
- Purpose: Identification
- Eligibility: Somali citizenship
- Expiration: 5 years

The Somali passport (Somali: baasaboor) is a passport issued to citizens of Somalia for international travel. Green Passports were formerly used, which have since been replaced with biometric passports to ensure authenticity. The passports are regulated by the federal government of Somalia.

== Overview ==
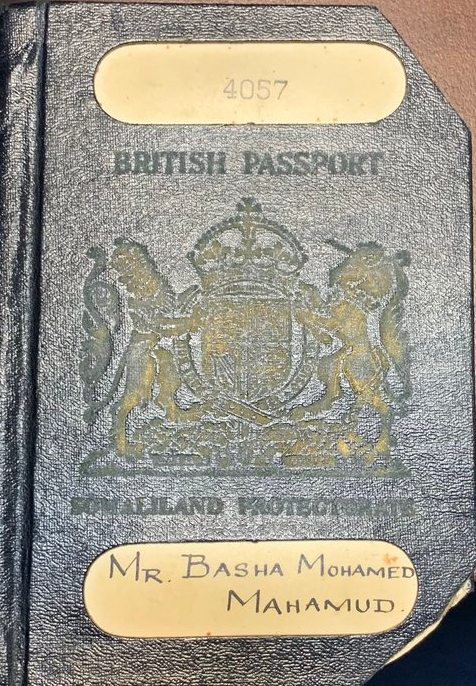
British Somaliland passport used in the 1930s.

In the 1930s, British Somaliland passports were issued.

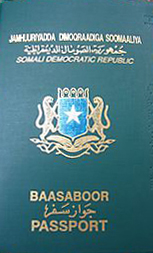
The front cover of the old non-biometric Green Passport.

Somalia's former socialist government originally used to issue a non-biometric Green Passport. This travel document still remained in use after the collapse of former President Siad Barre's regime.

After the collapse of the government and a power vacuum emerged with the Somali Civil War, numerous countries refused to recognize Somali passports and other documents due to widespread counterfeiting and black marketing, destruction of many records and a lack of recognized government. As of 2024, countries that do not recognize the Somali passport include several European Union member states, the United States, the United Kingdom and Canada. Countries that do not recognize the Somali passport may instead issue an approved visa on a separate travel document.

In response the Transitional National Government opened a new office in the 2000s to issue official state-approved passports. According to then Foreign Affairs Minister Muhammad Mahmud Shiil, the government would continue issuing old Somali passports with a new dry seal to prevent forgery or duplication, and passports already in circulation would a stamp with the new seal. The government announced in 2006 that it would issue a new machine-readable document to further ensure authenticity.

Since 2007, the Transitional Federal Government (TFG) of Somalia has issued an e-passport to comply with stricter international rules. In November 2010, the TFG opened a new passport-making facility in Mogadishu, the nation's capital. Printing of the travel documents had previously been conducted in the United Arab Emirates, which reportedly engendered a backlog in passport issuance. The repatriated printing facilities are believed to offer a more responsive passport delivery process. Officially issued by the Somali Immigration Department, the passports now contain built-in security features comparable with other countries.

In September 2011, the Transitional Federal Government officially banned use of Somalia's old Green Passport. According to Somali Immigration Officer, General Abdulaahi Gaafow Mohamoud, the identification document would no longer be accepted for business trips or travel by the end of the month. He added that the Green Passport would be replaced with a new blue model of e-passports that are particularly difficult to forge.

In December 2013, the Deputy Director-General of Somali Immigration and Naturalization Abdullahi Hagi Bashir Ismail announced that the Federal Government officially launched Somalia's new e-passport. Part of a broader initiative to strengthen security, the passport is issued by the Ministry of Interior's Department of Immigration. Citizens are eligible for the e-passport upon production of government-issued national identity documents and birth certificates.

In August 2025, the National Identification and Registration Authority (NIRA), under the 2023 Identification and Registration Act, and the Immigration and Citizenship Authority issued a joint mandate requiring all Somali citizens to present a valid national identification card when applying for a passport starting 1 September 2025. These requirements are part of efforts to tighten data security, improve public services, and enhance government efficiency.

== Visa requirements ==
Visa requirements for Somali citizens Somalia Freedom of movement Visa free Visa issued upon arrival eVisa Visa available both on arrival or online Visa required prior to arrival

As of 1 January 2017, Somali citizens had visa-free or visa on arrival access to 30 countries and territories, placing the Somali passport in the 100th-ranking group in terms of travel with no prior visa according to the Henley Visa Restrictions Index.

== See also ==
- Visa policy of Somalia
- Visa requirements for Somali citizens
