= Sierra Leonean passport =

Passports issued to Sierra Leone nationals

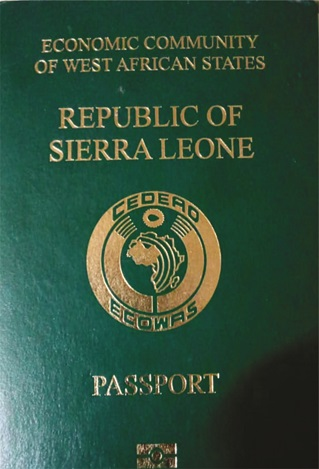
- Type: Passport
- Issued by: Sierra Leone
- Purpose: Identification
- Eligibility: Sierra Leonean citizenship

Sierra Leonean passports are issued to Sierra Leonean citizens for travel outside Sierra Leone. Sierra Leonean citizens can travel visa-free to member states of the Economic Community of West African States (ECOWAS), and visa-free or visa-on-arrival to 62 countries in total.

== Physical properties ==
A new passport was launched in 2022 to meet all ICAO guidelines, containing an electronically-readable e-chip. The passport contains the following information:

- Surname
- Given names
- Nationality (Sierra Leonean)
- Date of birth
- Sex
- Place of birth
- Date of Expiry
- Passport number

== Languages ==
The data page/information page is printed in English and French.

== See also ==
- ECOWAS passports
- List of passports
- Visa requirements for Sierra Leonean citizens
