= Visa requirements for Sierra Leonean citizens =

Administrative entry restrictions

Visa requirements for Sierra Leonean citizens are administrative entry restrictions by the authorities of other states placed on citizens of Sierra Leone. As of 2026, Sierra Leonean citizens had visa-free or visa on arrival access to 62 countries and territories, ranking the Sierra Leonean passport 71st in terms of travel freedom according to the Henley Passport Index.

== Visa requirements map ==
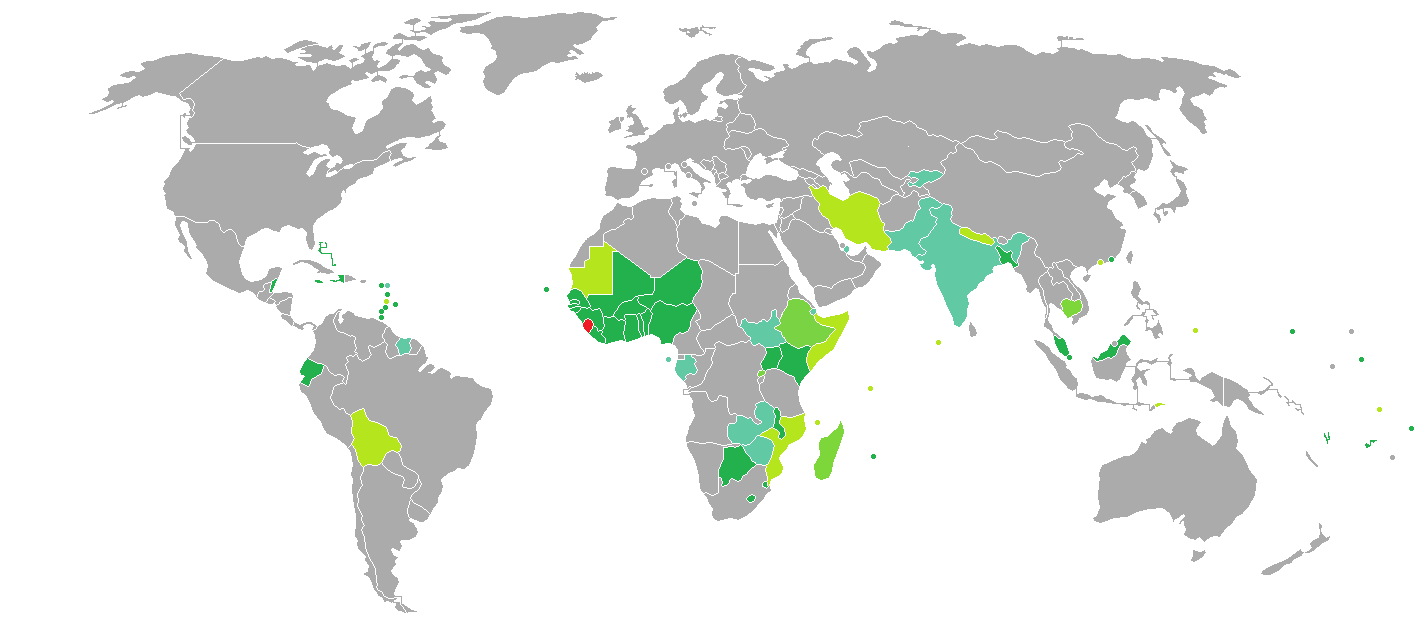
Sierra Leone Visa free access Visa obtainable on arrival eVisa Visa available both on arrival or online Pre-arrival visa required

== Visa requirements ==
Country	Visa requirement	Allowed stay	Notes (excluding departure fees)
Afghanistan	Visa required	30 days	Visa is not required in case born in Afghanistan or can proof that one of their parents is a national of Afghanistan or born in Afghanistan.; e-Visa : Visitors must arrive at Kabul International (KBL).
Albania	eVisa		Visa is not required for Holders of a valid multiple-entry Schengen, UK or US visa has been previously used once or residence permit of Schengen, UK, US or UAE 10 years.
Algeria	Visa required		
Andorra	Visa required		
Angola	Visa required		
Antigua and Barbuda	eVisa		
Argentina	Visa required		The AVE (High Speed Travel) is open to Sierra Leonean citizens holding valid, current ordinary passports traveling to Argentina for tourism. To do so, they must hold a valid category B2/J/B1/O/P (P1-P2-P3)/E/H-1B visa issued by the United States of America.
Armenia	Visa required		
Australia and territories	Visa required		May apply online (Online Visitor e600 visa).
Austria	Visa required		
Azerbaijan	Visa required		
Bahamas	Visa not required	3 months	
Bahrain	eVisa	14 days	
Bangladesh	Visa not required	90 days	
Barbados	Visa not required	6 months	
Belarus	Visa required		
Belgium	Visa required		
Belize	Visa not required		
Benin	Visa not required	90 days	
Bhutan	eVisa	90 days	Visa fee is 40 USD per person and visa application may be processed within 5 business days with duration of stay of 90 days.; e-Visa applicant is also subject to pay Sustainable Development Fee
Bolivia	eVisa / Visa on arrival	90 days	
Bosnia and Herzegovina	Visa required		
Botswana	Visa not required	90 days	90 days within any year period
Brazil	Visa required		
Brunei	Visa required		
Bulgaria	Visa required		
Burkina Faso	Visa not required		
Burundi	Visa on arrival	30 days	
Cambodia	eVisa / Visa on arrival	30 days	
Cameroon	eVisa		
Canada	Visa required		US permanent residents (Green card) holders can enter visa free
Cape Verde	Visa not required		
Central African Republic	Visa required		
Chad	eVisa		
Chile	Visa required		
China	Visa required		
Colombia	Visa required	90 days	May apply online.
Comoros	Visa on arrival	45 days	
Republic of the Congo	Visa required		
Democratic Republic of the Congo	eVisa	90 days	
Costa Rica	Visa required		
Côte d'Ivoire	Visa not required	90 days	
Croatia	Visa required		
Cuba	Visa required		Visa must be obtained in advance lieu of a tourist card.
Cyprus	Visa required		
Czech Republic	Visa required		
Denmark	Visa required		
Djibouti	eVisa	31 days	
Dominica	Visa not required	6 months	
Dominican Republic	Visa required		
Ecuador	eVisa	90 days	
Egypt	Visa required		
El Salvador	eVisa		
Equatorial Guinea	eVisa		
Eritrea	Visa required		
Estonia	Visa required		
Eswatini	Visa not required	30 days	
Ethiopia	eVisa / Visa on arrival	up to 90 days	Visa on arrival is obtainable only at Addis Ababa Bole International Airport.; e-Visa holders must arrive via Addis Ababa Bole International Airport.; e-Visa is available for 30 or 90 days.
Fiji	Visa not required	4 months	
Finland	Visa required		
France	Visa required		
Gabon	eVisa		Electronic visa holders must arrive via Libreville International Airport.
Gambia	Visa not required	90 days	
Georgia	Visa required		eVisa available for holders of a valid Schengen visa or a valid visa from any of the OECD member countries; or a valid residence permit of a Schengen or OECD country.
Germany	Visa required		
Ghana	Visa not required	90 days	
Greece	Visa required		
Grenada	Visa not required	3 months	
Guatemala	Visa required		Visa is not required up to 90 days if holding a valid residence permit issued by Australia, Canada, GCC member state the United States the United Kingdom or a Schengen Area Member State.
Guinea	Visa not required		
Guinea-Bissau	Visa not required	90 days	
Guyana	Visa required		
Haiti	Visa not required	3 months	
Honduras	Visa required		
Hungary	Visa required		
Iceland	Visa required		
India	e-Visa	60 days	e-Visa holders must arrive via 32 designated airports (Note: Ahmedabad; Amritsar; Bagdogra; Bengaluru; Bhubaneswar; Chandigarh; Chennai; Coimbatore; Delhi; Gaya; Goa-Dabolim; Goa-Manohar; Guwahati; Hyderabad; Indore; Jaipur; Kannur; Kochi; Kolkata; Kozhikode; Lucknow; Madurai; Mangaluru; Mumbai; Nagpur; Port Blair; Pune; Surat; Thiruvananthapuram; Tiruchirappalli; Varanasi; Visakhapatnam) or 5 designated seaports. (Note: Chennai; Cochin; Mormugao (Goa); Mumbai; Mangalore); An Indian e-Tourist Visa may only be obtained twice within 1 calendar year.; Foreigners of Pakistani origin or who hold a Pakistani Passport are not eligible for an e-Visa. Foreigners who are not Pakistani nationals, but whose parents or grandparents (either paternal or maternal) were born in, or were permanent residents in Pakistan, are also not eligible for an e-Visa.
Indonesia	Visa required		
Iran	eVisa / Visa on arrival	30 days	
Iraq	eVisa	30 days	
Ireland	Visa required		
Israel	Visa required		
Italy	Visa required		
Jamaica	Visa not required		
Japan	Visa required		Eligible for an e-Visa if residing in one these countries Australia, Brazil, Cambodia, Canada, India, Saudi Arabia, Singapore, South Africa, Taiwan, United Arab Emirates, United Kingdom, United States.; May apply online
Jordan	Visa required		
Kazakhstan	eVisa		
Kenya	Electronic Travel Authorisation	90 days	Applications can be submitted up to 90 days prior to travel and must be submitted at least 3 days in advance.; eTA fee is USD 32.50.; eTA is good for single entry, but visitors who leave Kenya to other EAC countries may re-enter provided that their eTA is still valid; Proof of reservation at the hotel where visitors plan to stay is required (if staying with friends, an invitation letter is also acceptable).; Yellow fever vaccination certificate is required if coming from endemic countries.; Can also be entered on an East Africa tourist visa issued by Rwanda or Uganda.
Kiribati	Visa not required	30 days	
North Korea	Visa required		
South Korea	Visa required		Multiple-Entry Visa may be granted to who entered South Korea 4 or more times within the last 2 years, or 10 or more visits in total (one of those 10 visits should be within the last 2 years).; May apply online
Kuwait	Visa required		e-Visa can be obtained for holders of a Residence Permit issued by a GCC member state under the following conditions: To be 18 years old and over.; The residence permit for a GCC state must be valid for at least another 3 months.; To be accompanied by the sponsor of the residence permit if the sponsor is an individual.; Does not apply to holders of a GCC Student Visa and Non-Skilled Worker Visa
Kyrgyzstan	eVisa		
Laos	Visa required		
Latvia	Visa required		
Lebanon	Visa required		In addition to a visa, an approval should be obtained from the Immigration department of the General Directorate of General Security (La Surete Generale).
Lesotho	Visa not required	90 days	
Liberia	Visa not required		
Libya	eVisa		
Liechtenstein	Visa required		
Lithuania	Visa required		
Luxembourg	Visa required		
Madagascar	eVisa / Visa on arrival	90 days	
Malawi	Visa not required	30 days	
Malaysia	Visa not required	30 days	
Maldives	Free visa on arrival	30 days	
Mali	Visa not required		
Malta	Visa required		
Marshall Islands	Visa required		
Mauritania	eVisa		
Mauritius	Visa not required	90 days	
Mexico	Visa required		Visa is not required for Holders of a valid visa of Canada, US, UK or a Schengen State and Permanent residence of Canada, Chile, Colombia, Schengen State, Japan, UK, US; Entry may be refused by immigration officials for individuals who were previously denied a US visa, even if holding a valid Mexican visa.
Micronesia	Visa not required	30 days	
Moldova	eVisa		visa not required if holding a valid visa /residence permit that is issued by a European Union member state or Schengen Area, Canada, Ireland, UK, US
Monaco	Visa required		
Mongolia	eVisa	30 days	
Montenegro	Visa required		Visa not required for holders of a valid Australia, Japan, Canada, New Zealand, Ireland, US, UK or a Schengen Visa.; Holders of residence permit in the United Arab Emirates may enter, in Montenegro for a duration of 10 days
Morocco	Visa required		May apply for an e-Visa if holding a valid visa or a residency document issued by one of the following countries: Schengen Area, Australia, Canada, Ireland, New Zealand, United Kingdom, United States a residency document issued by Cyprus, Japan, United Arab Emirates.
Mozambique	eVisa / Visa on arrival	30 days	
Myanmar	Visa required		
Namibia	eVisa / Visa on arrival	90 days	
Nauru	Visa required		
Nepal	eVisa / Visa on arrival	30 days	
Netherlands	Visa required		
New Zealand	Visa required		Holders of an Australian Permanent Resident Visa or Resident Return Visa may be granted a New Zealand Resident Visa on arrival permitting indefinite stay (pursuant to the Trans-Tasman Travel Arrangement), subject to meeting character requirements and obtaining an Electronic Travel Authority prior to departure.
Nicaragua	Visa required		VoA if having valid visas by US, Canada, or Schengen Member state
Niger	Visa not required		
Nigeria	Visa not required		
North Macedonia	Visa required		Visa is not required for stays upto 15 days if holding a valid multiple entry visa of Canada, the United States, United Kingdom, Schengen Area member state, or residence permit of Schengen Area member state.
Norway	Visa required		
Oman	eVisa		
Pakistan	eVisa		Online Visa eligible.; Electronic Travel Authorization to obtain a visa on arrival for business purposes.
Palau	Free visa on arrival	30 days	
Panama	Visa required		Visa is not required for holders of a multiple-entry visa valid for at least 6 months at the time of entry or permanent residency issued by Australia, Canada, European Union, Japan, Singapore, South Korea, US, UK.
Papua New Guinea	eVisa	60 days	May apply for an e-visa under the type of "Tourist - Own Itinerary".
Paraguay	Visa required		
Peru	Visa required		
Philippines	Visa required		Residents of the United Arab Emirates may obtain an eVisa through the official Philippine eVisa website. A valid Emirati residence visa must be shown upon an eVisa application.
Poland	Visa required		
Portugal	Visa required		
Qatar	eVisa	30 days	
Romania	Visa required		
Russia	Visa required		
Rwanda	Visa not required	90 days	
Saint Kitts and Nevis	Visa not required	90 days	
Saint Lucia	Visa on arrival	6 weeks	
Saint Vincent and the Grenadines	Visa not required	1 month	
Samoa	Visa not required	60 days	
San Marino	Visa required		
São Tomé and Príncipe	eVisa		Visa is obtained online.
Saudi Arabia	Visa required		Tourist visa on arrival for holders of a valid multiple entry visa from US, UK or Schengen area, under the condition that the multiple entry visa has been used at least once, proving that by showing the entry and exit stamps of the country of issuance.
Senegal	Visa not required	90 days	
Serbia	Visa required		
Seychelles	Free Visitor's Permit on arrival	3 months	
Singapore	Visa not required	30 days	
Slovakia	Visa required		
Slovenia	Visa required		
Solomon Islands	Visa required		VoA if having pre-arranged visa
Somalia	eVisa	30 days	
South Africa	Visa required		
South Sudan	eVisa		Obtainable online; Printed visa authorization must be presented at the time of travel
Spain	Visa required		
Sri Lanka	ETA / Visa on arrival		The standard visitor visa allows a stay of 60 days within any 6-month period.; Visa fees (for Standard visitor visa): SAARC - USD 35; Non SAARC - USD 75; e-Visa categories will be charged an additional USD 18.50 service fee.; If transiting from any of the Sri Lankan airports, An e-Visa is exempted (2 day transit period).
Sudan	Visa required		
Suriname	eVisa		
Sweden	Visa required		
Switzerland	Visa required		
Syria	eVisa		
Tajikistan	Visa required		
Tanzania	eVisa		
Thailand	eVisa		
Timor-Leste	Visa on arrival	30 days	At Presidente Nicolau Lobato International Airport or the Dili Sea Port only.
Togo	Visa not required		
Tonga	Visa required		
Trinidad and Tobago	Visa not required		
Tunisia	Visa required		
Turkey	Visa required		
Turkmenistan	Visa required		
Tuvalu	Visa on arrival	1 month	
Uganda	Visa not required	3 months	
Ukraine	Visa required		
United Arab Emirates	eVisa	30 days	May apply online.; May apply also using 'Smart service'.
United Kingdom and Crown dependencies	Visa required		
United States	Partial visa restrictions		Effective June 9, 2025, no new immigrant visas will be issued to nationals of the seven countries, and no B-1, B-2, B-1/B-2, F, M, or J nonimmigrant visas will be issued, with certain exemptions.
Uruguay	Visa required		
Uzbekistan	Visa required		
Vanuatu	Visa not required	120 days	
Vatican City	Visa required		Open borders but de facto follows Italian visa policy.
Venezuela	Visa required		
Vietnam	eVisa	90 days	Visa free for 30 days when visiting Phú Quốc
Yemen	Visa required		
Zambia	eVisa	90 days	
Zimbabwe	eVisa	90 days	

== Dependent, Disputed, or Restricted territories ==
Unrecognized or partially recognized countries

Territory	Conditions of access	Notes
Abkhazia	Visa required	
Kosovo	Visa required	Do not need a visa a holder of a valid biometric residence permit issued by one of the Schengen member states or a valid multi-entry Schengen Visa, a holder of a valid Laissez-Passer issued by United Nations Organizations, NATO, OSCE, Council of Europe or European Union a holder of a valid travel documents issued by EU Member and Schengen States, United States of America, Canada, Australia and Japan based on the 1951 Convention on Refugee Status or the 1954 Convention on the Status of Stateless Persons, as well as holders of valid travel documents for foreigners (max. 15 days stay)
Northern Cyprus	Visa not required	
Palestine	Visa not required	Arrival by sea to Gaza Strip not allowed.
Somaliland	Visa on arrival	30 days for 30 US dollars, payable on arrival.
South Ossetia	Visa not required	Multiple entry visa to Russia and three day prior notification are required to enter South Ossetia.
Taiwan	Visa required	
Transnistria	Visa not required	Registration required after 24h.

Dependent and autonomous territories

Territory	Conditions of access	Notes
China
Hong Kong	eVisa	
Macau	Visa on arrival	
Denmark
Faroe Islands	Visa required	
Greenland	Visa required	
France
French Guiana	Visa required	
French Polynesia	Visa required	
(France) French West Indies	Visa required	French West Indies refers to Martinique, Guadeloupe, Saint Martin and Saint Barthélemy.
Mayotte	Visa required	
New Caledonia	Visa required	
Réunion	Visa required	
Saint Pierre and Miquelon	Visa required	
Wallis and Futuna	Visa required	
Netherlands
Aruba	Visa required	
Caribbean Netherlands	Visa required	Caribbean Netherlands refers to Bonaire, Sint Eustatius and Saba.
Curaçao	Visa required	
Sint Maarten	Visa required	
New Zealand
Cook Islands	Visa not required	31 days
Niue	Visa not required	30 days
Tokelau	Visa required	
United Kingdom
Akrotiri and Dhekelia	Visa required	
Anguilla	Visa required	Holders of a valid visa issued by the United Kingdom do not require a visa.
Bermuda	Visa required	
British Indian Ocean Territory	Special permit required	Special permit required.
British Virgin Islands	Visa not required	
Cayman Islands	Visa required	
Falkland Islands	Visa required	
Gibraltar	Visa required	
Montserrat	Visa not required	
Pitcairn Islands	Visa not required	14 days visa free and landing fee 35 USD or tax of 5 USD if not going ashore.
Ascension Island	eVisa	3 months within any year period
Saint Helena	eVisa	
Tristan da Cunha	Permission required	Permission to land required for 15/30 pounds sterling (yacht/ship passenger) for Tristan da Cunha Island or 20 pounds sterling for Gough Island, Inaccessible Island or Nightingale Islands.
South Georgia and the South Sandwich Islands	Permit required	Pre-arrival permit from the Commissioner required (72 hours/1 month for 110/160 pounds sterling).
Turks and Caicos Islands	Visa required	Holders of a valid visa issued by Canada, United Kingdom or the USA do not required a visa for a maximum stay of 90 days.
United States
American Samoa	Visa required	
Guam	Visa required	
Northern Mariana Islands	Visa required	
Puerto Rico	Visa required	
U.S. Virgin Islands	Visa required	
Antarctica and adjacent islands
Special permits required for Bouvet Island, British Antarctic Territory, French Southern and Antarctic Lands, Argentine Antarctica, (Australia) Australian Antarctic Territory, (Antártica Chilena Province) Chilean Antarctic Territory, (Australia) Heard Island and McDonald Islands, (Norway) Peter I Island, (Norway) Queen Maud Land, (New Zealand) Ross Dependency.

== See also ==
- Visa policy of Sierra Leone
- Sierra Leonean passport
