= Algerian nationality law =

Algerian Nationality Code

Parliament of Algeria
- Long title: Code de la Nationalité Algérienne/الجز ائرية قانون الجنسية
- Enacted by: Government of Algeria
- Status: Current legislation

Algerian nationality law is regulated by the Constitution of Algeria, as amended; the Algerian Nationality Code, and its revisions; and various international agreements to which the country is a signatory. These laws determine who is, or is eligible to be, a national of Algeria. The legal means to acquire nationality, formal legal membership in a nation, differ from the domestic relationship of rights and obligations between a national and the nation, known as citizenship. Algerian nationality is typically obtained under the principle of jus sanguinis, i.e. by birth in Algeria or abroad to parents with Algerian nationality. It can be granted to persons with an affiliation to the country, or to a permanent resident who has lived in the country for a given period of time through naturalisation.

== Acquisition of nationality ==
Nationality can be acquired in Algeria through birth or naturalization.

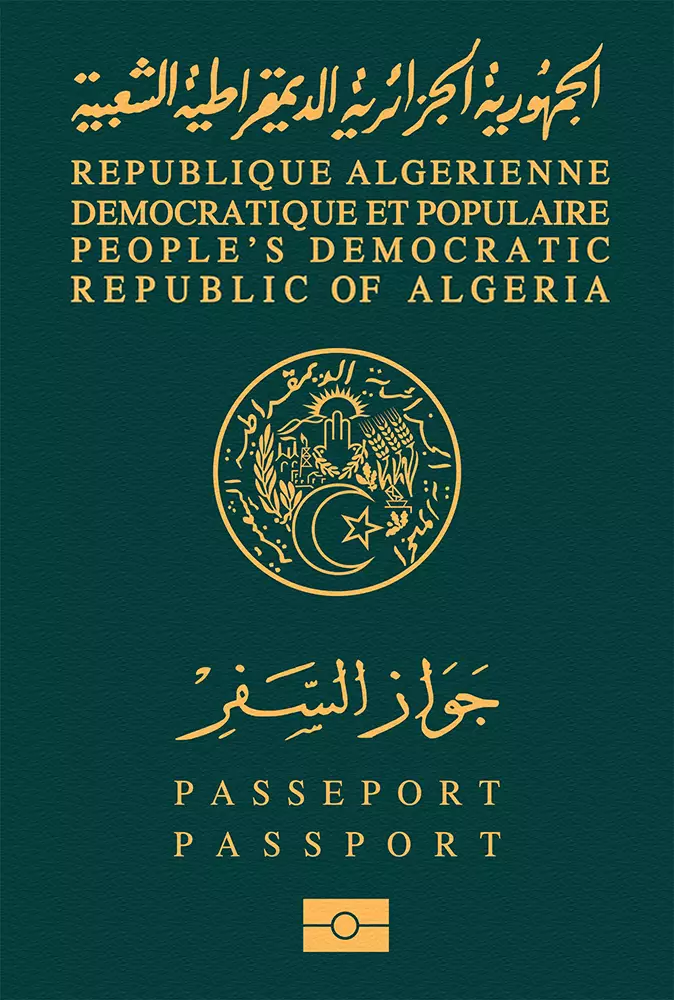
Algerian passport

=== By birth ===
- Persons born to at least one parent with Algerian nationality; or
- Foundlings born in the territory of unknown parentage.

=== By naturalization ===
Naturalization can be granted to persons who have resided in the territory for a sufficient period of time, seven years, to confirm they understand the customs and traditions of the society. General provisions are that applicants be of good character and in good health, have no criminal history, and are able to support themselves. If nationality is being considered for exceptional service to the nation, there can be no limiting conditions. In the case of a foreign spouse, a couple must have been married for three years and have established a two-year residency to apply for naturalization. Muslim law in Algeria prevents full adoption of children. This lack of a legal parent-child relationship means that children who have been assigned guardians under the Islamic adoptional jurisprudence, known as kafala, are unable to inherit from a guardian and thus cannot derive parental nationality.

== Loss of nationality ==
Algerians are allowed to renounce their nationality, provided they will not be rendered stateless, but must have permission to do so. Persons can be denaturalized in Algeria by committing a crime against state security; by performing acts which demonstrate allegiance to another nation; or by committing a serious criminal act, including fraud.

== Dual nationality ==
Algeria does not have a provision for dual nationality in its Nationality Code. There was no provision concerning the issue in the 1963 Code, but a stipulation was added in 1970 that required renouncing other nationality for completion of the naturalization process. This provision remained in place until it was eliminated from the Code in 2005. Certain political and executive positions require that candidates, as well as their wives have no other nationality. In some instances, dual nationality can result in a revocation of nationality.

Since 2024, Algeria has allowed visa-free entry for Algerian citizens residing abroad who hold a valid foreign passport, provided they can prove their Algerian citizenship, recognizing dual citizenship.

== History ==
=== Ottoman period (1533-1834) ===
The central Maghreb was ruled by unified medieval empires until the thirteenth century. After their collapse, fragmented dynastic states contested for sovereignty of the area. Regional warfare was continuous between dynastic powers like the Hafsid, Wattasid, and Zayyanid dynasties, as well as imperial powers like the Austrian, Spanish, and Ottoman Empires. In 1529, Khayar al-Din defeated the Spaniards, ousting them from Algiers and in 1533 the Ottoman Regency of Algiers was founded. Under Ottoman rule, subjects owed allegiance to the sultan, who in exchange for their taxes provided protection for their lives, property, and rights, including the freedom to practice of their religion. Though Muslim subjects had greater status, inhabitants who were ahl al-Kitāb (People of the Book), meaning Jewish, Christian, or Zoroastrian, were permitted to become subjects.

Through the 1790s, the Regency remained stable, but there was a growing commercial dependence on European trade. A series of internal coups d'état between 1791 and 1817 led to political and socio-economic turmoil. Rural rebellions against unjust governance erupted in the 1820s. In April 1827, a long-lasting dispute over French failure to pay for grain erupted into war being declared by both Regency administrators and the French. For three years, French ships blockaded Algiers, before a military invasion was launched to capture the city in 1830. Debates began in the French parliament over whether to officially colonize the territory at the end of 1833. In 1834 an ordinance to regulate the former Regency of Algiers granted a military governor general the power to rule by decree, subject to the Ministry of War's approval. The military government would rule until the end of World War II.

=== French period (1834-1962) ===
The first document issued regarding Algerian nationality was a circular from the French Minister of Foreign Affairs on 31 January 1834. It divided Algerians into categories, defining who were or were not entitled to be French protected persons. Those who emigrated and had no wish to return to the territory were excluded from protection. French conquest of Algerian territory continued for more than a decade, consolidating and incorporating lands from the coastal regions to the interior. In 1848, a decree, which was later incorporated into Article 109 of the Second Republic's Constitution declared that Algeria was a French territory to be governed by specific laws until the constitution was extended there. This provision laid the groundwork for nationality legislation based upon whether the native inhabitants were able to be assimilated by adopting European standards. From 1848, those persons who settled in the colonies and were from France were considered nationals who had full rights and were subject to French law. However, those born in the new territories were considered to be nationals without citizenship. This meant that from 1848 when the Civil Code was extended to all of the French citizens in the colonies, women were legally incapacitated and paternal authority was established over their children. Upon marriage, a woman married to a French man automatically acquired the same nationality as her spouse. Illegitimate children were barred from inheritance and nationality could only be transmitted through a father. Non-citizen nationals were governed by traditional laws concerning marriage and inheritance which placed the well-being of the community above individual rights. These laws prevented a wife from being treated as a slave, required her husband to support her, and entitled her kin to a bride price, to compensate them for the loss of her fertility to their kinship group and secure the legality of the union. Having paid the price for the marriage contract, she and her offspring belonged to the kinship network of her husband and could be inherited if her husband died.

This two-tiered subjecthood was further codified in the Sénatus-consulte of 14 July 1865, issued by Louis Napoleon which provided that Algerian Jews and Muslims were nationals but not citizens of France, as they were governed under Koranic or Mosaic law. (Note: The laws which were applicable to native subjects increasingly were replaced by French legislation. French public law regulating governance, replaced Islamic law in 1830. By 1833, rabbinical courts were restricted to implementing marriage and religious laws and from 1842, French courts had complete jurisdiction over the Jewish population. French property laws were extended to Algeria in 1844 and French penal law went into effect from 1859. By 1873, only personal status laws, including family law and inheritance law, were still within the control of Islamic jurisprudence.) Those born in Algeria were considered to be French protected persons and entitled to be nationals. If a national wanted to acquire the full benefit of French citizenship, they were required to give up adherence to religious law and abide by French law. However, voluntarily leaving Algeria without the intent to return or remaining outside the territory for an extended period could be grounds for being denaturalized. Foreigners could naturalize as French citizens after three years residency. Those who were French citizens were always in the minority, the non-citizen national Muslim population was in the majority, and throughout the 20th century, there were more non-French Europeans in regions of Algeria than French. On 24 October 1870, the Crémieux Decree collectively naturalized Algerian Jews, granting them full French citizenship. Its accompanying implementation regulation, dated 7 October 1871, clarified that the 1870 Decree was applicable to Jews whose parents who were born in Algeria or had domiciled in Algeria prior to the French colonization. This combination of jus soli, jus sanguinis, and jus domicili became common for establishing all Algerian nationality regardless of the subject's faith, except Muslims, who were treated as foreigners. Under the Code de l'indigénat (Code of Indigenous Status) promulgated for Algeria in 1881, native nationals in the new colonies followed customary law for matters such as marriage and inheritance, but specific and repressive civil and criminal statutes spelled out in the Code.

The French Nationality Law of 1889 codified previous statutory laws, changing the French standard from jus sanguinis to jus soli and was extended to the French West Indies and Algeria except for the Algerian native population. In an attempt to counter-act the increase in foreign-European immigration, the law automatically naturalized all foreigners born in Algeria when they reached the age of majority, unless they specifically chose not to be French. Under its terms, women who would become stateless by the rule to acquire their spouse's nationality were allowed to retain their French nationality upon marriage. The Nationality Law was modified in 1897 when it was extended to the remainder of the French colonies. Clarification in the 1897 decree included that bestowing nationality by birth in French territory only applied to children born in France, restoring descent requirements for the colonies. It also provided that a married woman lost her nationality if her husband's nation granted her his status. On 25 March 1915, a law was passed which extended French naturalization with citizenship to subjects who were at that time non-citizen nationals on the basis of service to the nation, such as serving in the military or having been awarded the cross of the Legion of Honour. This was extended in 1919 to include the person naturalizing as well has his wife and minor children, but few took advantage of it, as it required giving up their right to be ruled under religious law.

In 1927, France passed a new Nationality Law, which under Article 8, removed the requirement for married women to automatically derive the nationality of a husband and provided that her nationality could only be changed if she consented to change her nationality. It also allowed children born in France to native-born French women married to foreigners to acquire their nationality from their mothers. When it was implemented it included Guadeloupe, Martinique and Réunion but was extended to the remaining French possessions in 1928. A decade later, the legal incapacity of married women was finally invalidated for French citizens. At the end of World War II, three statutes, one issued on 7 March 1944 granted French citizenship to those who had performed services to the nation, such as serving as civil servants or receiving recognitions; the Constitution of 1946 granted French citizenship to all subjects of France's territories without having to renounce their personal status as natives; and the Statute on Algeria, issued 20 September 1947, which purported to grant equality to all French citizens, though it denied Algerian women suffrage. In 1945, a new Code of French Nationality was passed, which conferred once again automatic French nationality on foreign wives of French men, but allowed mothers who were French nationals to pass their nationality to children born outside of France. It expressly applied to Algeria, French Guiana, Guadeloupe, Martinique and Réunion and was extended to the Overseas Territories in 1953, but in the case of the latter had distinctions for the rights of those who were naturalized. With the passage of the Constitution of 1958, nationality provisions were standardized for France, Overseas Departments, and Overseas Territories.

=== Post-independence (1962-present) ===
In 1962, Algeria gained its independence from France. At independence, under the terms of the Évian Accords, nationals were to become either Algerian or French effective on 1 January 1963. Nationals who wished to remain French could request naturalization by filing a request in France or one of the Overseas Departments before 22 March 1967. However, the Nationality Code (Ordinance No. 63-69), which was passed in 1963, restricted nationality to persons who had two paternal ancestral lines which had Muslim status in Algeria, meaning that the father and one of his grandfathers were Muslims born in Algeria. It limited those who could naturalize to persons who had participated in the struggle for independence. The Nationality Code (Ordinance No. 70-86) issued on 15 December 1970 provided that children derived the status of the father. Only in cases of illegitimacy or the father being stateless, could a child be conferred the nationality of its mother at birth. If a child was born in Algeria to a mother who was a national and a father who was foreign, upon reaching majority the child could naturalize. In the same circumstance, a child born abroad could only naturalize with the approval of the Ministry of Justice. The 1970 statute added a provision for renouncing the other nationality upon naturalization, but the provision was eliminated in 2005.

In 1996, Algeria signed the Convention on the Elimination of All Forms of Discrimination Against Women, but reserved items regarding the equality of nationality which conflicted with its Family and Nationality Codes. Through an intensive campaign, women's groups were able to press the government to begin drafting legal changes in 2003. In February 2005, the Nationality Code was amended by Ordinance No. 05-01, which granted women equality in passing on their nationality to their children or a foreign spouse. That same year the Family Code was amended to allow women the ability to marry foreigners, divorce, or retain marital property. In 2009, Algeria removed its reservations to CEDAW.
