= Visa policy of Nepal =

Policy on permits required to enter Nepal

The visa policy of Nepal allows citizens of most countries to obtain either an Online tourist visa or a visa on arrival while citizens of India are allowed freedom of movement. However, citizens of certain other countries must obtain a visa from one of the Nepalese diplomatic missions.

All visitors must have a passport valid for at least 6 months from the date of arrival and are allowed to stay in Nepal for a maximum of 150 days within 1 calendar year.

== Visa policy map ==
Visa policy of Nepal Nepal Freedom of movement Free visa on arrival (all visitors) / eVisa Free visa on arrival (tourists only) / eVisa Visa on arrival / eVisa Physical Visa required

== Freedom of movement ==
Indian citizens do not require a visa to enter Nepal. They may reside in the country permanently, as Article 7 of the 1950 Indo-Nepal Treaty of Peace and Friendship allows free movement of people between the two countries on a reciprocal basis. Indian citizens may use either an Indian passport or a Voter ID card with photo to enter Nepal from India.

== Visas on arrival ==
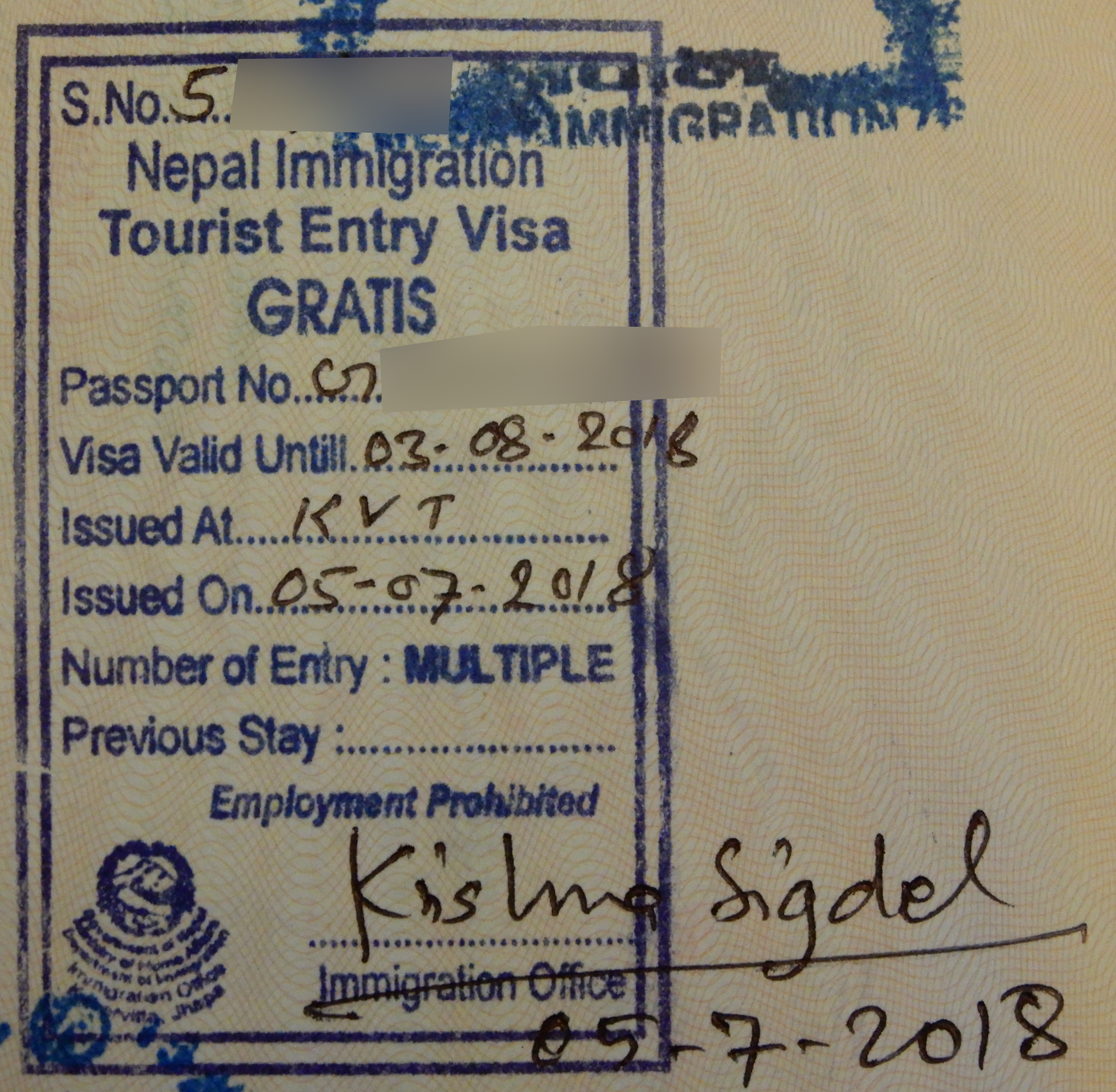
Free tourist visa on arrival issued at Kakarbhitta checkpoint

Foreign citizens may obtain a visa on arrival which is good for multiple entries and allows visitor to stay for no more than 15, 30 or 90 days. In addition, foreign citizens may obtain a visa using a kiosk at the airport. Costs (in US dollars) as of May 2026 are:

- 15 day maximum: $30
- 30 day maximum: $50
- 90 day maximum: $125.

Holders of temporary passports are not eligible unless they have a temporary passport issued by a European Union member state.

Visa on arrival is available at:

- Tribhuvan International Airport, Kathmandu
- Birganj (India border)
- Bheemdatta (India border)
- Dhangadhi (India border)
- Nepalgunj (India border)
- Kakarbhitta (India border)
- Kodari (China border, opposite: Zhangmu)
- Siddharthanagar (India border)

=== Free visa on arrival ===
Citizens of South Asian Association for Regional Cooperation (SAARC) member states (except Afghanistan) may obtain a free visa on arrival for 30 days:

- Bangladesh
- Bhutan
- Maldives
- Pakistan
- Sri Lanka

Citizens of the following countries and territories may obtain a free visa on arrival if they are travelling as tourists:

- China
- Hong Kong
- Macao

== Non-ordinary passports ==
Holders of diplomatic or service passports of the following countries may enter Nepal without a visa for up to 90 days (unless otherwise noted):

- Brazil
- Cambodia (30 days)
- China (30 days)
- Indonesia (30 days)
- Israel
- Jordan
- Mongolia
- Myanmar
- Oman
- Qatar
- Russia
- Singapore
- Thailand
- Vietnam

Nepal has signed visa exemption agreements with the following countries, but they have not yet entered into force:

Country	Passports	Agreement signed on
Serbia	Diplomatic, official	18 March 2025

== Online tourist visas ==
Foreign citizens except those listed below may also obtain an online tourist visa to enter Nepal.

== Visa required in advance ==
Citizens of the following countries and territories must apply for a visa at the Nepalese diplomatic missions:

- Afghanistan
- Cameroon
- Eswatini
- Ethiopia
- Ghana
- Iran
- Iraq
- Liberia
- Nigeria
- Palestine
- Somalia
- Syria
- Zimbabwe

== Visitor statistics ==
Most of the visitors who travelled to Nepal for tourism purposes were from the following countries (excluding India):

Country	2016	2015
China	66,984	123,805
Sri Lanka	44,367	37,546
United States	42,687	49,830
Thailand	30,953	33,422
United Kingdom	29,730	36,759
Australia	18,619	24,516
South Korea	18,112	23,205
Japan	17,613	25,829
France	16,405	24,097
Germany	16,405	18,028
Total	538,970	790,118

== See also ==
- Visa requirements for Nepalese citizens
