= Henley Passport Index =

Ranking of countries by travel freedom

- Website type: Passport guidance
- Available in: English, Chinese, French, Spanish, Arabic and Russian
- Headquarters: London
- Country of origin: United Kingdom
- Owners: Henley & Partners
- Website: Official website
- Commercial: Yes
- Registration: None
- Launched: 2005; 21 years ago
- Current status: Online

The Henley Passport Index is an annual global ranking of countries according to the travel freedom allowed by those countries' ordinary passports for their citizens. The index was created by Christian Kälin and launched in 2005 as Henley & Partners Visa Restrictions Index. Its name was changed to Henley Passport Index in January 2018. The index is updated on a quarterly basis to reflect changes in global visa policies.

The index annually ranks 199 passports of the world by the number of countries that their holders can travel to without requiring a visa. The number of countries that a specific passport can access becomes its visa-free "score". The data is obtained from the International Air Transport Association (IATA)'s Timatic documentation requirements database.

== Definition of the index ==
The Henley Passport index ranks passports according to the number of destinations that can be reached using a particular country's ordinary passport without the need of a prior visa ("visa-free"). The number of destinations includes not only visa-free entry, but also visa on arrival and Electronic Travel Authorization.

The survey ranks 199 passports against 227 destination countries, territories, and micro-states.

The IATA maintains a database of travel information worldwide and all destinations that are in the IATA database are considered by the index. However, because not all territories issue passports, there are far fewer passports ranked than destinations about which queries are made.

== Method ==
To determine the score for each country or territory, its passport is checked against the IATA Timatic database in several steps:

1. Each of the 199 passports on the list is checked against all 227 possible travel destinations for which travel restriction information exists in the IATA database. The score is updated throughout the year.
2. Each query must satisfy certain conditions:
  - passport is issued in the country of nationality
  - passport holder is an adult citizen of the country that issued the passport and a lone traveller, not part of a tourist group
  - entry is sought for tourism or business
  - the stay is a minimum of three days
3. Further conditions:
  - queries are made only for holders of normal passports, not diplomatic, service, emergency, or temporary passports; and other travel documents are disregarded
  - passport holders need not meet any complex requirements for entry (for example, possessing a government-issued letter, translations, or empty pages)
  - passport holders have all necessary vaccinations and certificates
  - passport holders are arriving at and departing from the same airport
  - passport holders are seeking a short stay rather than a transit
  - the port of entry is a major city or capital, in cases where this is required
  - requirements by the destination country or territory regarding a particular length of validity of passports are disregarded
  - passport holders meet all basic requirements for entry (for example, holding a hotel reservation or having proof of sufficient funds or return tickets)
  - advance passenger information and advance approval to board are not considered to be a visa requirement or travel restriction, neither is the requirement to pay airport tax
4. If no visa is required for passport holders from a particular country or territory to enter the destination, then that passport scores 1. The passport also scores 1 if a visa on arrival, a visitor's permit, or an automatically approved electronic travel authority (ETA) can be obtained because they do not require manual pre-departure government approval, perhaps because of specific visa-waiver programs in place.
5. Where visas are needed, or where passport holders must get manually government-approved electronic visas (e-Visas) before departure, a score of 0 is given. If passport holders must get government approval before leaving in order to obtain a visa on arrival, this also scores 0.
6. The score for each passport is then totalled by adding up its scores for all destinations.
7. The index ignores temporary restrictions or airspace closures.
8. It considers mobility data based on national GDPs and the percentage of global wealth that the country's passport could provide access to.

== Rankings ==
=== 2026 Henley Passport Index ===
According to 2026 Henley Passport Index, Singapore retains the top spot as the world's most powerful passport, giving visa-free access to 192 out of the 227 destinations worldwide to its holders. Japan, South Korea and the United Arab Emirates are second in the ranking. The UAE passport has moved up the ranking by eight places making it the first in the Middle East.

The third spot is taken by Sweden. The Afghan passport is ranked last in the index making it the least powerful passport, which gives its holders visa-free access to 23 countries. The South African passport is ranked in the top 50 after a decade, rising by 10% between 2024 and 2025.

Seychelles and Mauritius retained their positions in the index as Africa’s highest ranked passports. Seychelles, which was ranked at 23rd offers visa-free access to 155 destinations and Mauritius ranked at 26 gives access to 148 destinations.

The United States passport has seen a decline in its ranking over the last 20 years. In 2006, the USA passport was ranked the number 1 passport, along with Finland and Denmark. The ranking has dropped to the 10th spot in the 2026 report, with 36 other countries offering greater visa-free mobility than the US passport.

According to the index, the mobility gap between the top and least ranked passport has widened sharply over the last 20 years.

2026 rank	Passport issuing country	Visa-free destinations
1	Singapore	192
2	Japan	187
2	South Korea	187
2	United Arab Emirates	187
3	Sweden	186
4	Belgium	185
4	Denmark	185
4	Finland	185
4	France	185
4	Germany	185
4	Ireland	185
4	Italy	185
4	Luxembourg	185
4	Netherlands	185
4	Norway	185
4	Spain	185
4	Switzerland	185
5	Austria	184
5	Greece	184
5	Malta	184
5	Portugal	184
6	Hungary	183
6	Malaysia	183
6	Poland	183
6	United Kingdom	183
7	Australia	182
7	Canada	182
7	Czech Republic	182
7	Latvia	182
7	New Zealand	182
7	Slovakia	182
7	Slovenia	182
8	Croatia	181
8	Estonia	181
9	Liechtenstein	180
9	United States	180
9	Lithuania	180
10	Iceland	179
11	Bulgaria	177
11	Romania	177
12	Monaco	176
13	Chile	174
13	Cyprus	174
13	Hong Kong	174
14	Andorra	169
15	Argentina	168
15	Brazil	168
16	Israel	166
16	San Marino	166
17	Barbados	163
17	Brunei	163
18	Bahamas	158
19	Saint Kitts and Nevis	157
19	Saint Vincent and the Grenadines	157
20	Mexico	156
21	Uruguay	155
22	Antigua and Barbuda	154
22	Seychelles	154
23	Vatican City	151
24	Costa Rica	148
25	Grenada	147
25	Mauritius	147
25	Panama	147
26	Dominica	145
26	Paraguay	145
26	Trinidad and Tobago	145
27	Saint Lucia	144
28	Ukraine	142
29	Macau	141
29	Peru	141
30	Serbia	135
31	Taiwan	134
32	Guatemala	132
32	Solomon Islands	132
33	El Salvador	131
34	Colombia	130
35	Honduras	129
35	Samoa	129
36	Marshall Islands	127
36	Tonga	127
37	Montenegro	126
37	North Macedonia	126
38	Nicaragua	125
38	Tuvalu	125
39	Kiribati	122
40	Albania	121
40	Bosnia and Herzegovina	121
41	Georgia	120
41	Federated States of Micronesia	120
41	Palau	120
42	Moldova	119
43	Venezuela	116
44	Russia	113
44	Turkey	113
45	Qatar	111
46	Belize	100
46	South Africa	100
47	Kuwait	96
48	Ecuador	93
49	Maldives	92
49	Timor-Leste	92
50	Guyana	88
51	Bahrain	87
51	Fiji	87
51	Saudi Arabia	87
51	Vanuatu	87
52	Nauru	86
53	Jamaica	85
54	Oman	84
54	Papua New Guinea	84
55	China	82
56	Botswana	81
56	Kosovo	81
57	Kazakhstan	78
58	Belarus	77
58	Bolivia	77
59	Thailand	76
60	Suriname	75
61	Namibia	74
62	Lesotho	73
63	Dominican Republic	71
63	Morocco	71
63	Eswatini	71
64	Indonesia	70
64	Malawi	70
65	Kenya	69
66	Tanzania	68
66	Gambia	68
67	Azerbaijan	67
67	Ghana	67
68	Rwanda	66
68	Tunisia	66
69	Benin	65
69	Philippines	65
69	Uganda	65
70	Armenia	64
70	Mongolia	64
70	Zambia	64
71	Cape Verde	63
72	Sierra Leone	62
73	Zimbabwe	61
74	Kyrgyzstan	59
74	Mozambique	59
74	Uzbekistan	59
75	São Tomé and Príncipe	58
76	Togo	57
77	Burkina Faso	56
77	Cuba	56
77	India	56
77	Senegal	56
78	Algeria	55
78	Ivory Coast	55
78	Gabon	55
78	Madagascar	55
78	Mauritania	55
79	Niger	54
80	Mali	53
80	Tajikistan	53
81	Equatorial Guinea	52
81	Guinea	52
82	Chad	51
83	Comoros	50
83	Guinea-Bissau	50
84	Egypt	49
84	Haiti	49
84	Jordan	49
84	Liberia	49
85	Angola	48
85	Burundi	48
85	Central African Republic	48
85	Vietnam	48
86	Bhutan	47
86	Cambodia	47
86	Cameroon	47
87	Congo	46
88	Djibouti	45
88	Laos	45
88	Turkmenistan	45
89	Nigeria	44
90	DR Congo	43
90	Lebanon	43
91	Ethiopia	42
91	Myanmar	42
92	South Sudan	41
92	Sudan	41
93	Libya	39
93	Sri Lanka	39
94	Eritrea	38
94	Iran	38
94	Palestine	38
95	Bangladesh	34
96	Nepal	35
96	North Korea	35
97	Somalia	32
98	Pakistan	31
98	Yemen	31
99	Iraq	29
100	Syria	26
101	Afghanistan	23

=== 2024 Henley Passport Index ===
As of 16 July 2024, the Singaporean passport offers holders visa-free or visa-on-arrival access to a total of 195 countries and territories, followed by the Japanese, French, German, Italian, and Spanish passports offer holders visa-free or visa-on-arrival access to a total of 193 countries followed by the Austrian, Finnish, Irish, Luxembourgish, Dutch, South Korean and Swedish passports, each offering 192 visa-free or visa-on-arrival countries and territories to its holders. These rankings were subsequently followed by the Belgian, Danish, New Zealand, Norwegian, Swiss, and British passports, each offering visa-free or visa-on-arrival travel to 191 countries and territories. While the 2024 Henley Passport Index shows a worldwide improvement in access to visa-free travel, the gap between the top and the bottom ranked countries has widened.

Asian countries like Japan and Singapore have dominated the top position in the Index for the last five years.

The Afghan passport has once again been labelled by the index as the least powerful passport in the world, with its nationals only able to visit 28 destinations visa-free. This was followed by the Syrian passport at 29 destinations, the Iraqi passport at 31 destinations and the Pakistani and Yemeni passports at 34 destinations. Among African countries, the Somali passport is the weakest passport according to the index.

2024 rank	Passport issuing country	Visa-free destinations
1	Singapore	195
2	Italy	193
2	Germany	193
2	France	193
2	Japan	193
2	Spain	193
3	Austria	192
3	Finland	192
3	Ireland	192
3	Luxembourg	192
3	Netherlands	192
3	South Korea	192
3	Sweden	192
4	Belgium	191
4	Denmark	191
4	New Zealand	191
4	Norway	191
4	Switzerland	191
4	United Kingdom	191
5	Australia	190
5	Czech Republic	190
5	Portugal	190
6	Greece	188
6	Poland	188
7	Canada	187
7	Hungary	187
7	Malta	187
8	United States	186
9	Estonia	185
9	Lithuania	185
9	United Arab Emirates	185
10	Iceland	184
10	Latvia	184
10	Slovakia	184
10	Slovenia	184
11	Croatia	183
12	Liechtenstein	182
12	Malaysia	182
13	Cyprus	178
13	Monaco	178
14	Bulgaria	177
14	Romania	177
15	Chile	175
16	San Marino	172
16	Argentina	172
17	Andorra	171
17	Brazil	171
18	Hong Kong	170
18	Israel	170
19	Brunei	166
20	Barbados	165
21	Bahamas	161
22	Mexico	159
23	Saint Kitts and Nevis	157
23	Saint Vincent and the Grenadines	157
23	Uruguay	157
24	Seychelles	156
25	Vatican City	155
26	Antigua and Barbuda	153
27	Costa Rica	151
27	Trinidad and Tobago	151
28	Mauritius	150
29	Panama	149
30	Saint Lucia	148
30	Ukraine	148
31	Grenada	147
31	Paraguay	147
32	Dominica	143
32	Macau	143
33	Peru	141
33	Taiwan	141
34	Serbia	140
35	El Salvador	136
36	Guatemala	135
37	Colombia	134
37	Solomon Islands	134
38	Honduras	133
39	Samoa	131
39	Tonga	131
40	Marshall Islands	129
41	Montenegro	128
41	Nicaragua	128
41	North Macedonia	128
41	Tuvalu	128
42	Kiribati	124
42	Federated States of Micronesia	124
42	Palau	124
42	Venezuela	124
43	Albania	123
43	Bosnia and Herzegovina	123
44	Georgia	122
44	Moldova	122
45	Russia	116
45	Turkey	116
46	Qatar	107
47	South Africa	106
48	Belize	102
49	Kuwait	101
50	Timor-Leste	97
51	Ecuador	95
52	Maldives	94
53	Vanuatu	92
54	Fiji	90
55	Guyana	89
55	Jamaica	89
55	Nauru	89
56	Botswana	88
56	Saudi Arabia	88
57	Bahrain	87
58	Oman	86
59	China	85
59	Papua New Guinea	85
60	Thailand	82
61	Belarus	81
61	Namibia	81
62	Bolivia	80
63	Kosovo	79
63	Lesotho	79
63	Kazakhstan	79
63	Suriname	79
64	Eswatini	77
65	Indonesia	76
66	Dominican Republic	75
66	Kenya	75
66	Malawi	75
67	Tanzania	73
68	Morocco	72
69	Azerbaijan	71
69	Gambia	71
70	Uganda	70
70	Zambia	70
71	Cape Verde	69
71	Tunisia	69
72	Armenia	68
72	Ghana	68
73	Philippines	67
74	Sierra Leone	66
75	Rwanda	65
75	Zimbabwe	65
76	Benin	64
76	Kyrgyzstan	64
76	Mongolia	64
76	Mozambique	64
77	São Tomé and Príncipe	63
78	Cuba	62
78	Uzbekistan	62
79	Togo	61
80	Burkina Faso	60
80	Gabon	60
80	Madagascar	60
81	Ivory Coast	59
81	Guinea	59
82	India	58
82	Senegal	58
82	Tajikistan	58
83	Equatorial Guinea	57
83	Mauritania	57
83	Niger	57
84	Algeria	55
84	Guinea-Bissau	55
84	Jordan	55
84	Mali	55
85	Comoros	54
86	Cambodia	53
86	Central African Republic	53
86	Chad	53
86	Haiti	53
87	Angola	52
87	Bhutan	52
87	Egypt	52
88	Liberia	51
88	Vietnam	51
89	Burundi	50
89	Cameroon	50
89	Congo	50
89	Turkmenistan	50
90	Djibouti	49
90	Laos	49
91	DR Congo	46
91	Ethiopia	46
92	Lebanon	45
92	Myanmar	45
92	Nigeria	45
93	South Sudan	44
93	Sri Lanka	44
94	Iran	43
94	Sudan	43
95	Eritrea	42
96	North Korea	41
97	Bangladesh	40
97	Palestinian Authority	40
98	Libya	39
98	Nepal	39
99	Somalia	35
100	Pakistan	33
100	Yemen	33
101	Iraq	31
102	Syria	29
103	Afghanistan	26

=== 2023 ===
As of 8 December 2023, the Singaporean passport offered holders visa-free or visa-on-arrival access to a total of 195 countries and territories, followed by the Japanese with 193 and the Finnish, French, German, Italian, South Korean, Spanish and Swedish passports, each offering 190 visa-free or visa-on-arrival countries and territories to its holders. These rankings were subsequently followed by the Austrian, Danish, Luxembourgeois and British passports, each offering visa-free or visa-on-arrival travel to 189 countries and territories.

An Afghan passport had once again been labelled by the index as the least powerful passport in the world, with its nationals only able to visit 27 destinations visa-free. This was followed by the Iraqi passport at 29 destinations and the Syrian passport at 30 destinations.

2023 rank	Passport issuing country	Visa-free destinations
1	Japan	193
2	Singapore	192
3	Austria	190
3	Finland	190
3	France	190
3	Germany	190
3	Italy	190
3	South Korea	190
3	Spain	190
3	Sweden	190
4	Denmark	189
4	Ireland	189
4	Luxembourg	189
4	Netherlands	189
4	United Kingdom	189
5	Belgium	188
5	Malta	188
5	Portugal	188
5	Norway	188
6	Czech Republic	187
6	New Zealand	187
6	Poland	187
6	Switzerland	187
7	Australia	186
7	Canada	186
7	Greece	186
7	Hungary	186
7	United States	186
8	Lithuania	185
9	Latvia	184
9	Slovakia	184
9	Slovenia	184
10	Estonia	183
11	Iceland	182
11	Malaysia	182
13	Cyprus	180
13	Liechtenstein	180
14	United Arab Emirates	179
15	Bulgaria	177
15	Romania	177
16	Croatia	176
16	Monaco	176
17	Chile	175
18	Argentina	173
19	San Marino	172
20	Brazil	171
19	Andorra	170
19	Hong Kong	170
20	Brunei	166
21	Barbados	163
22	Israel	159
22	Mexico	159
23	Bahamas	156
24	Seychelles	155
24	Saint Kitts and Nevis	155
25	Saint Vincent and the Grenadines	154
25	Vatican City	154
26	Uruguay	153
27	Costa Rica	151
28	Antigua and Barbuda	150
28	Trinidad and Tobago	150
29	Mauritius	148
30	Grenada	147
30	Saint Lucia	147
30	Ukraine	150
31	Macau	144
31	Panama	144
31	Taiwan	144
32	Dominica	143
32	Paraguay	143
33	Peru	136
34	Serbia	137
35	Guatemala	136
36	Honduras	134
37	Georgia	132
37	Colombia	132
37	El Salvador	132
37	Solomon Islands	132
38	Samoa	131
39	Tonga	130
40	Nicaragua	127
40	Tuvalu	127
40	Venezuela	127
41	North Macedonia	125
42	Montenegro	124
44	Albania	123
44	Kiribati	123
45	Marshall Islands	122
46	Moldova	120
47	Palau	119
48	Bosnia and Herzegovina	119
49	Federated States of Micronesia	116
51	Russia	118
52	Turkey	112
53	Belize	104
54	Qatar	103
55	South Africa	102
56	Vanuatu	101
57	Kuwait	98
58	Timor-Leste	94
59	Ecuador	92
60	Maldives	91
61	Nauru	89
62	Fiji	88
63	Bahrain	87
63	Botswana	87
64	Guyana	86
64	Jamaica	86
65	Saudi Arabia	83
66	Oman	82
66	Papua New Guinea	82
67	China	80
67	Thailand	80
68	Belarus	79
69	Bolivia	78
69	Lesotho	78
69	Namibia	78
70	Suriname	77
71	Kazakhstan	76
72	Indonesia	75
72	Eswatini	75
73	Malawi	74
74	Kenya	73
75	Tanzania	72
76	Kosovo	71
76	Tunisia	70
76	Zambia	70
77	Azerbaijan	69
77	Dominican Republic	69
77	Gambia	69
78	Uganda	67
79	Philippines	66
79	Zimbabwe	66
80	Armenia	65
80	Cape Verde	65
80	Morocco	65
80	Sierra Leone	65
81	Ghana	63
81	Kyrgyzstan	63
82	Cuba	62
83	Mongolia	61
83	Mozambique	61
83	Rwanda	61
84	Benin	60
84	India	60
85	São Tomé and Príncipe	59
85	Tajikistan	59
85	Uzbekistan	59
86	Mauritania	58
87	Burkina Faso	57
88	Gabon	56
88	Ivory Coast	56
88	Senegal	56
89	Equatorial Guinea	55
89	Guinea	55
89	Madagascar	55
89	Vietnam	55
90	Algeria	54
90	Cambodia	54
90	Togo	54
91	Comoros	53
91	Jordan	53
91	Mali	53
91	Niger	53
92	Bhutan	52
92	Central African Republic	52
92	Chad	52
92	Egypt	52
92	Guinea-Bissau	52
92	Turkmenistan	52
93	Angola	50
93	Burundi	50
93	Cameroon	50
93	Laos	50
94	Congo	49
94	Liberia	49
95	Djibouti	48
95	Haiti	48
96	Myanmar	47
97	Ethiopia	46
98	Eritrea	45
98	Nigeria	45
98	South Sudan	45
99	Iran	44
100	DR Congo	42
100	Sudan	42
101	Lebanon	41
102	Libya	40
102	North Korea	40
102	Sri Lanka	40
103	Bangladesh	39
104	Palestine	38
105	Nepal	36
106	Somalia	35
107	Yemen	34
108	Pakistan	33
109	Syria	30
110	Iraq	29
111	Afghanistan	27

=== 2022 ===
As of 2022, a Japanese passport offered its holders visa-free or visa-on-arrival access to a total of 193 countries and territories, with South Korean and Singapore passports each offering 192 visa-free or visa-on-arrival countries and territories to their holders. An American passport offered its holders visa-free or visa-on-arrival access to 186 countries and territories, with the British passport offering 187 visa-free or visa-on-arrival countries and territories to their holders. Canadian and Australian passports each offered their holders visa-free access to 185 countries and territories.

An Afghan passport had once again been labelled by the index as the least powerful passport in the world, with its nationals only able to visit 27 destinations visa-free.

2022 rank	Passport issuing country	Visa-free destinations
1	Japan	193
2	Singapore	192
2	South Korea	192
3	Germany	190
3	Spain	190
4	Finland	189
4	Italy	189
4	Luxembourg	189
5	Austria	188
5	Denmark	188
5	Netherlands	188
5	Sweden	188
6	France	187
6	Ireland	187
6	Portugal	187
6	United Kingdom	187
7	Belgium	186
7	New Zealand	186
7	Norway	186
7	Switzerland	186
7	United States	186
8	Australia	185
8	Canada	185
8	Czech Republic	185
8	Greece	185
8	Malta	185
9	Hungary	183
10	Lithuania	182
10	Poland	182
10	Slovakia	182
11	Estonia	181
11	Latvia	181
11	Slovenia	181
12	Iceland	180
13	Malaysia	179
14	Liechtenstein	178
15	Cyprus	176
15	United Arab Emirates	176
16	Chile	174
16	Monaco	174
16	Romania	174
17	Bulgaria	173
17	Croatia	173
18	Hong Kong	171
19	Argentina	170
19	Brazil	170
20	San Marino	169
21	Andorra	168
22	Brunei	166
23	Barbados	163
24	Israel	159
24	Mexico	159
25	Saint Kitts and Nevis	157
26	Bahamas	155
27	Vatican City	154
28	Seychelles	153
28	Uruguay	153
29	Saint Vincent and the Grenadines	152
30	Antigua and Barbuda	151
30	Trinidad and Tobago	151
31	Costa Rica	150
32	Saint Lucia	147
33	Grenada	146
33	Mauritius	146
34	Dominica	145
34	Taiwan	145
35	Macau	144
35	Ukraine	144
36	Panama	143
37	Paraguay	142
38	Peru	136
38	Serbia	136
39	El Salvador	134
40	Guatemala	133
40	Honduras	133
41	Colombia	132
41	Samoa	132
41	Solomon Islands	132
42	Tonga	130
42	Venezuela	129
43	Nicaragua	128
43	Tuvalu	128
44	North Macedonia	125
45	Kiribati	124
45	Montenegro	124
46	Marshall Islands	123
47	Moldova	121
48	Palau	120
49	Russia	119
50	Bosnia and Herzegovina	118
50	Federated States of Micronesia	118
51	Georgia	116
52	Albania	115
53	Turkey	110
54	South Africa	105
55	Belize	103
56	Qatar	99
57	Vanuatu	98
58	Kuwait	96
59	Timor-Leste	94
60	Ecuador	92
61	Nauru	90
62	Fiji	89
62	Maldives	89
63	Guyana	88
64	Botswana	87
64	Jamaica	87
65	Bahrain	86
66	Papua New Guinea	83
67	Oman	81
67	Saudi Arabia	81
68	Bolivia	80
68	China	80
69	Namibia	79
69	Thailand	79
70	Belarus	78
71	Lesotho	77
71	Suriname	77
72	Kazakhstan	76
73	Eswatini	75
74	Malawi	74
75	Indonesia	72
75	Kenya	72
75	Tanzania	72
75	Zambia	72
76	Tunisia	71
77	Azerbaijan	70
77	Dominican Republic	70
78	Gambia	69
79	Cape Verde	67
79	Philippines	67
79	Uganda	67
80	Armenia	66
80	Zimbabwe	66
81	Cuba	65
81	Ghana	65
81	Morocco	65
82	Kyrgyzstan	64
82	Sierra Leone	64
83	Mozambique	63
84	Benin	62
84	Mongolia	62
85	Rwanda	61
85	São Tomé and Príncipe	61
86	India	60
86	Mauritania	60
86	Tajikistan	60
87	Burkina Faso	59
87	Uzbekistan	59
88	Gabon	58
89	Ivory Coast	57
89	Senegal	57
90	Equatorial Guinea	56
90	Madagascar	56
91	Guinea	55
91	Mali	55
91	Togo	55
91	Vietnam	55
92	Bhutan	54
92	Cambodia	54
92	Chad	54
92	Comoros	54
92	Niger	54
93	Algeria	53
93	Central African Republic	53
93	Egypt	53
93	Guinea-Bissau	53
93	Jordan	53
93	Turkmenistan	53
94	Angola	51
94	Burundi	51
94	Cameroon	51
94	Laos	51
95	Liberia	50
96	Congo	49
96	Haiti	49
97	Djibouti	48
98	Myanmar	47
99	Ethiopia	46
99	Nigeria	46
100	Eritrea	44
100	South Sudan	44
101	Iran	43
102	DR Congo	42
102	Lebanon	42
102	Sri Lanka	42
102	Sudan	42
103	Bangladesh	41
103	Kosovo	41
103	Libya	41
104	North Korea	40
105	Nepal	38
105	Palestine	38
106	Somalia	35
107	Yemen	34
108	Pakistan	32
109	Syria	30
110	Iraq	29
111	Afghanistan	27

=== 2006–2015 ===
A number of Asian and European countries are notable for their stability over the past decade, and Belgium, France, Italy, Luxembourg, Japan, Singapore, Spain, and Sweden all remain in exactly the same position as 10 years before. The 'Top 10s' were almost identical, with 30 countries in 2015, compared to 26 a decade before. While Liechtenstein dropped, the Czech Republic, Finland, Hungary, Malta, Slovakia, and South Korea all made it into the top 10.

Taiwan, Albania, the United Arab Emirates, Bosnia and Herzegovina, and Serbia all moved up more than 20 places in the Henley & Partners Visa Restrictions Index over the period, while the biggest drops were experienced by Guinea (−32), Liberia (−33), Sierra Leone (−35), and Bolivia (−37).

=== Older rankings ===
In the table below, the "access" columns denote the number of visa-free destinations for holders of that passport. Unless indicated otherwise, the data in this table is taken from these sources.

Country	2020 rank	2020 access	2019 rank	2010 rank	2006 rank
Japan	1	191	1	6	3
Singapore	2	190	1	11	8
Germany	3	189	2	5	2
South Korea	3	189	2	13	11
Finland	4	188	2	4	1
Italy	4	188	3	5	3
Luxembourg	4	188	3	4	3
Spain	4	188	4	6	4
Austria	5	187	5	8	6
Denmark	5	187	3	2	1
France	6	186	4	5	3
Ireland	6	186	6	7	2
Netherlands	6	186	5	5	5
Portugal	6	186	5	8	7
Sweden	6	186	4	3	2
Belgium	7	185	6	6	4
Switzerland	7	185	6	10	4
Norway	7	185	6	7	4
United Kingdom	7	185	6	1	3
United States	7	185	6	7	1
Czech Republic	8	184	7	18	21
Greece	8	184	6	12	9
Malta	8	184	7	15	11
New Zealand	8	184	8	9	6
Australia	9	183	9	9	9
Canada	9	183	6	9	6
Hungary	10	182	10	18	19
Lithuania	11	181	9	19	24
Poland	11	181	13	16	16
Slovakia	11	181	9	17	22
Iceland	12	180	10	13	9
Latvia	12	180	10	20	26
Slovenia	12	180	10	17	17
Estonia	13	179	11	19	26
Liechtenstein	14	178	12	14	10
Malaysia	14	178	12	13	9
Monaco	15	175	14	21	15
Chile	16	174	13	27	14
Cyprus	16	174	14	18	12
Romania	17	172	16	22	34
Bulgaria	18	171	17	25	29
Argentina	19	170	17	26	19
Brazil	19	170	17	28	20
Croatia	19	170	18	35	28
Hong Kong	19	170	18	19	13
United Arab Emirates	19	170	15	65	62
San Marino	20	168	19	23	14
Andorra	21	167	20	27	20
Brunei	22	166	21	24	19
Barbados	23	161	22	29	35
Israel	24	160	22	25	18
Mexico	25	159	23	32	21
Saint Kitts and Nevis	26	156	24	31	40
Bahamas	27	155	24	30	35
Uruguay	28	153	25	34	20
Antigua and Barbuda	29	151	28	33	39
Seychelles	29	151	26	39	46
Costa Rica	30	150	27	37	23
Trinidad and Tobago	30	150	29	45	36
Vatican City	31	149	29	39	
Mauritius	32	148	30	40	46
Saint Vincent and the Grenadines	32	148	31	47	38
Saint Lucia	33	146	31	46	39
Taiwan	33	146	31	69	55
Macau	34	144	33	44	35
Grenada	35	143	32	49	41
Paraguay	36	142	32	39	30
Panama	37	141	34	41	30
Dominica	38	140	35	51	46
Peru	39	135	36	58	56
El Salvador	40	134	37	42	31
Honduras	40	134	37	42	32
Serbia	40	134	39	47	64
Guatemala	41	133	38	42	30
Samoa	42	131	39	53	49
Solomon Islands	42	131	40	52	44
Vanuatu	43	130	40	55	51
Nicaragua	44	129	41	43	33
Ukraine	44	129	43	65	64
Venezuela	44	129	38	36	25
Colombia	45	127	43	73	64
Tuvalu	45	127	42	54	48
Tonga	46	125	44	57	52
Montenegro	47	124	46	48	
North Macedonia	47	124	45	46	
Kiribati	48	122	46	56	49
Marshall Islands	48	122	46	66	61
Moldova	49	120	47	66	
Palau	50	119	47	70	
Federated States of Micronesia	51	118	47	69	
Russia	51	118	48	49	62
Bosnia and Herzegovina	52	117	49	74	71
Georgia	53	116	50	72	68
Albania	54	114	51	78	79
Turkey	55	111	52	46	46
Belize	56	101	54	50	42
South Africa	56	101	53	47	37
Kuwait	57	95	56	58	58
Qatar	57	95	57	63	60
Timor-Leste	57	95	55	85	
Ecuador	58	91	58	64	56
Nauru	59	89	60	56	54
Fiji	60	88	59	57	51
Guyana	60	88	60	57	45
Jamaica	61	86	61	56	45
Botswana	62	85	62	60	50
Maldives	62	85	61	56	52
Papua New Guinea	63	84	62	59	56
Bahrain	64	82	63	62	59
Oman	65	79	64	68	61
Bolivia	66	78	65	67	29
Suriname	66	78	65	66	57
Thailand	66	78	66	69	67
Namibia	67	77	67	62	56
Saudi Arabia	67	77	69	71	65
Kazakhstan	68	76	68	73	68
Belarus	69	75	67	72	64
Lesotho	69	75	69	64	47
China	70	74	72	88	78
Eswatini	70	74	70	65	52
Malawi	71	73	71	64	50
Kenya	72	72	72	64	52
Indonesia	73	71	73	84	67
Tanzania	73	71	75	68	56
Zambia	73	71	73	65	53
Tunisia	74	69	75	67	59
Gambia	75	68	74	61	45
Azerbaijan	76	67	76	76	68
Philippines	76	67	77	73	63
Uganda	76	67	76	70	58
Cape Verde	77	66	76	73	
Dominican Republic	78	65	78	77	71
Ghana	78	65	77	67	53
Zimbabwe	78	65	78	70	56
Cuba	79	64	77	78	69
Morocco	79	64	80	76	66
Armenia	80	63	81	76	69
Kyrgyzstan	80	63	80	74	68
Sierra Leone	80	63	79	64	51
Benin	81	62	80	73	61
Mozambique	81	62	81	82	74
Mongolia	81	62	80	82	72
São Tomé and Príncipe	82	61	81	83	74
Rwanda	83	60	84	87	73
Burkina Faso	84	59	83	76	62
Mauritania	84	59	83	40	58
India	85	58	82	77	71
Tajikistan	85	58	84	77	69
Gabon	86	57	85	85	72
Ivory Coast	86	57	84	72	
Uzbekistan	86	57	85	80	72
Senegal	87	56	86	76	60
Equatorial Guinea	88	55	89	89	76
Guinea	88	55	85	75	60
Madagascar	88	55	87	83	71
Togo	88	55	86	76	62
Cambodia	89	54	88	87	79
Mali	89	54	87	75	59
Niger	89	54	87	76	60
Vietnam	89	54	90	84	78
Bhutan	90	53	89	83	77
Chad	90	53	88	82	
Comoros	90	53	88	89	
Guinea-Bissau	90	53	87	79	63
Turkmenistan	90	53	90	86	77
Central African Republic	91	52	90	81	68
Algeria	92	51	91	79	73
Jordan	92	51	92	97	75
Angola	93	50	92	92	77
Burundi	93	50	93	89	78
Egypt	93	50	92	84	
Laos	93	50	92	85	76
Cameroon	94	49	92	85	70
Haiti	94	49	92	85	74
Liberia	94	49	93	82	65
Congo	95	48	94	85	69
Djibouti	96	47	95	91	77
Myanmar	96	47	95	92	81
Nigeria	97	46	95	76	62
Ethiopia	98	44	97	92	78
South Sudan	99	43	97		
DR Congo	100	42	97	90	
Eritrea	100	42	99	93	76
Sri Lanka	100	42	96	84	74
Bangladesh	101	41	99	85	68
Iran	101	41	99	92	82
Kosovo	102	40	98	89	
Lebanon	102	40	100	94	79
Sudan	102	40	102	96	79
North Korea	103	39	100	90	78
Libya	104	38	100	87	77
Nepal	104	38	101	88	76
Palestine	104	38	102	97	
Somalia	105	33	104	95	81
Yemen	105	33	103	88	78
Pakistan	106	32	104	90	79
Syria	107	29	105	87	80
Iraq	108	28	106	97	81
Afghanistan	109	26	107	98	83

== See also ==
- Five Nations Passport Group
- The Passport Index
