= Bureau of Consular Affairs (Taiwan) =

Government agency in Taiwan

- 外交部領事事務局
- Seal of the Bureau of Consular Affairs

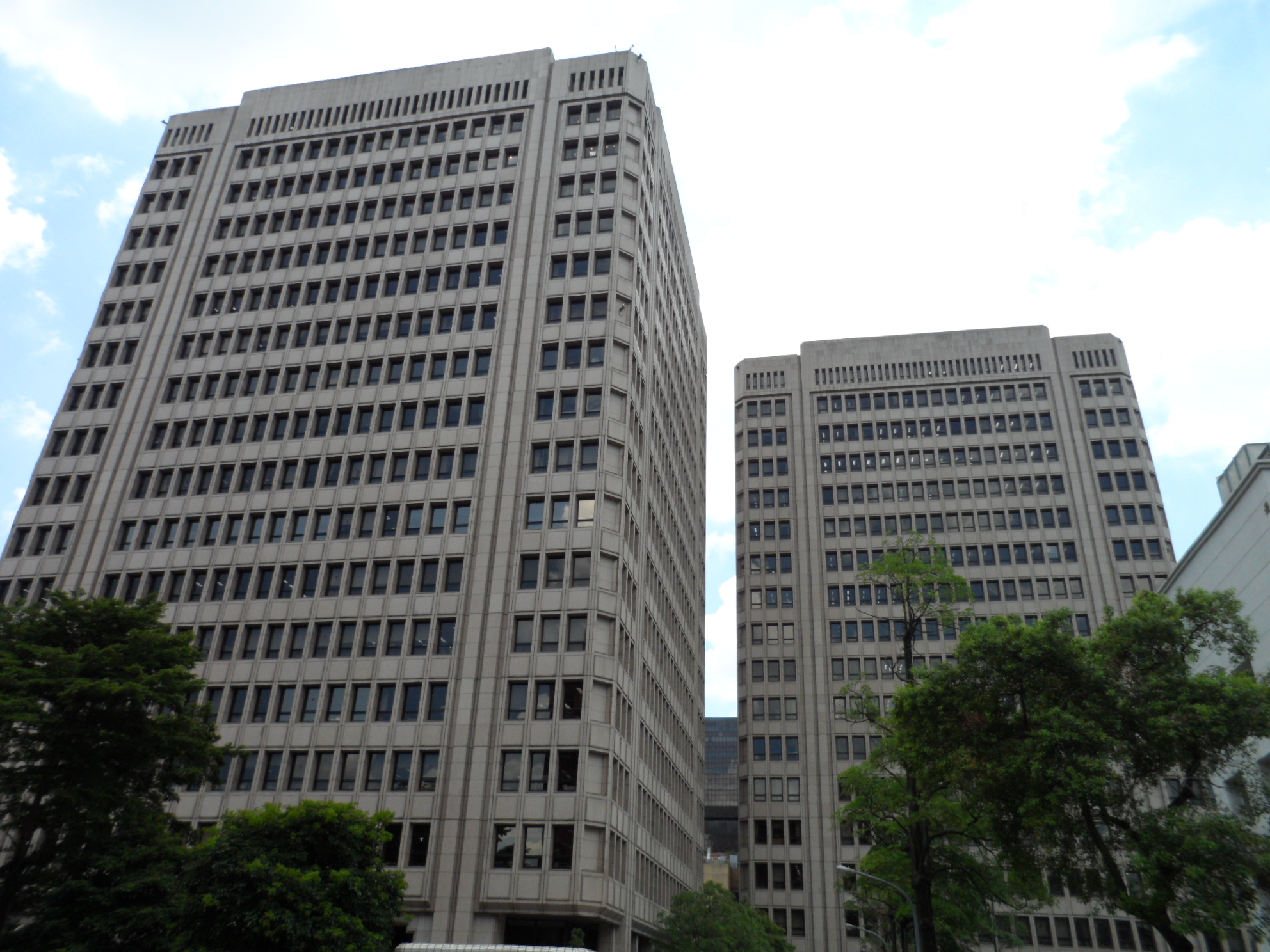

Agency overview
- Jurisdiction: Republic of China
- Headquarters: Zhongzheng, Taipei, Taiwan; 24.983751°N 121.541369°E
- Parent Ministry: Ministry of Foreign Affairs
- Website: www.boca.gov.tw

The Bureau of Consular Affairs (BOCA; Chinese: 外交部領事事務局; pinyin: Wàijiāobù Lǐngshì Shìwùjú) is the agency of the Ministry of Foreign Affairs of the Republic of China (ROC) which provide passport services, visa services, document authentication and the coordination of emergency assistance to the ROC citizens abroad.

== Organizational structure ==
- Passport Administration Division
- Visa Division
- Document Authentication Division
- Passport Issuing Division
- Offices of the Secretariat, Accounting, Human Resources and Government Ethics
- Information Management Unit
- Congressional Liaison Unit
- Legal Unit

== Branch office ==
- Taiwan Taoyuan International Airport

== Transportation ==
The BOCA building is accessible by NTU Hospital Station of the Taipei Metro on the Red Line.
