= Moroccan passport =

Passports issued to citizens and nationals of Morocco

- The front cover of a contemporary Moroccan biometric passport.
- Type: Passport
- Issued by: Morocco
- First issued: 15 December 2009 (biometric passport booklet)
- Purpose: Identification
- Eligibility: Moroccan citizenship
- Expiration: 5 years
- Cost: 500 MAD

Moroccan passports are issued to nationals and citizens of Morocco for the purpose of international travel. Besides serving as a proof of Moroccan citizenship, they facilitate the process of securing assistance from Moroccan consular officials abroad if needed. Since 15 December 2009, a biometric passport was available for all new applicants. Moroccan citizens can now apply for a passport anytime, anywhere. Launched in tandem with the new enrollment program, a web portal outlining issuance requirements takes applicants through the procedure step by step, from the comfort of their keyboard. Once proof of identity has been gathered, the applicant can fill in an online form to print and submit in person at the prefecture.

== Appearance ==
=== Cover design ===
The Moroccan passport has the following wording on its cover :

Top: "المملكة المغربية"
"ⵜⴰⴳⵍⴷⵉⵜ ⵏ ⵍⵎⵖⵔⵉⴱ"
"ROYAUME DU MAROC"
"KINGDOM OF MOROCCO"

Middle: The Coat of Arms of Morocco

Bottom: "جواز سفر"
"ⴰⵎⵣⵣⵔⵉ ⵏ ⵉⵡⵓⵜⵜⴰ"
"PASSEPORT"
"PASSPORT"

There are several colors for different types of passports:

- Ordinary passports are green
- Diplomatic passports are burgundy red
- Special passports are blue
- Service passports are brown

=== Identity page ===
The identity page of an ordinary passport contains the following data :

- Photograph of the bearer
- Type of passport (P)
- Country code (MAR)
- Passport number
- Family name of the bearer
- Given name(s) of the bearer
- Nationality ("Marocaine مغربية", Moroccan)
- Sex
- Date of birth
- Place of birth
- Address
- Date of issuance
- Authority issuing the passport
- National ID number
- Date of expiry
- Scanned signature of the bearer
- Machine Readable Zone

== Visa requirements ==
Visa requirements for Moroccan citizens holding ordinary passports Morocco Part of Western Sahara Visa free access Visa on arrival eVisa Visa available both on arrival or online Visa required

As of April 2025, Moroccan citizens have visa-free or visa-on-arrival access to 74 countries and territories, ranking the Moroccan passport 67th in the world in terms of travel freedom according to the Henley Passport Index.

== See also ==
- Visa requirements for Moroccan citizens
- Visa policy of Morocco
- SansVisa.ma : Moroccan travelers portal of countries without a VISA requirement
