= List of diplomatic missions of Morocco =

This is a list of diplomatic missions of Morocco, excluding honorary consulates.

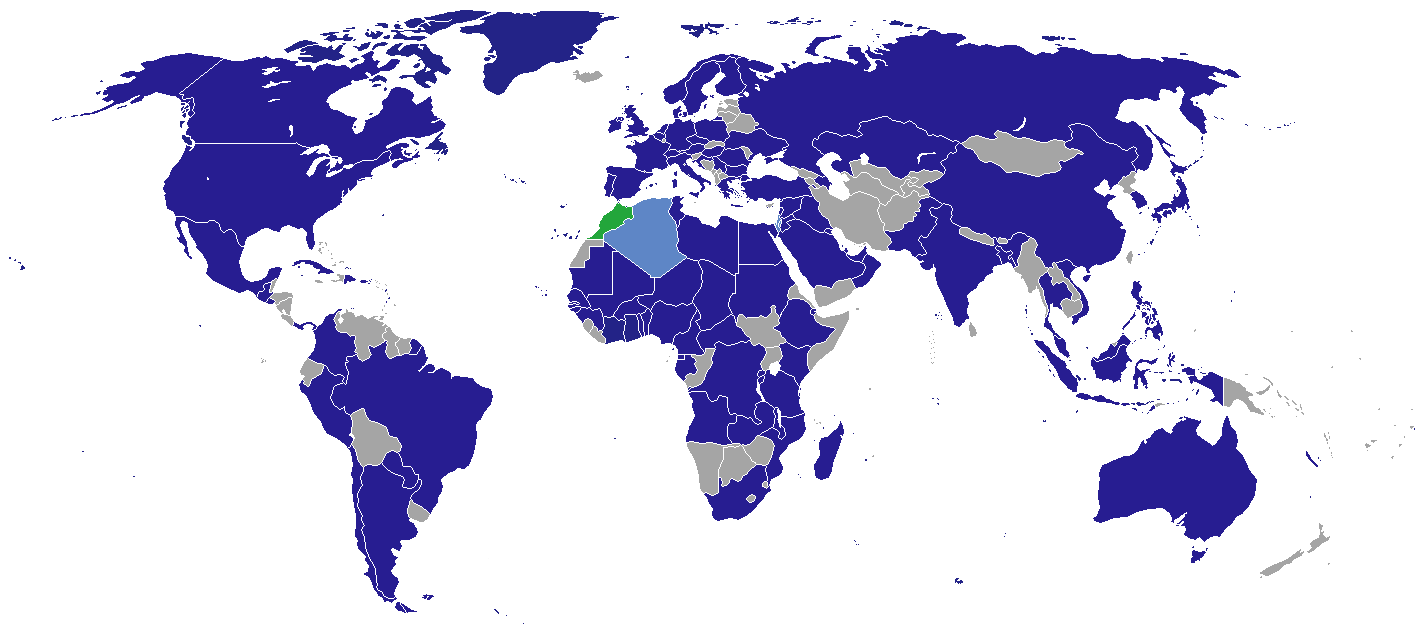
Map of Moroccan diplomatic missions

== Current missions ==
=== Africa ===
Host country	Host city	Mission	Concurrent accreditation	Ref.
Algeria (Note: Despite the severance of diplomatic relations between Morocco and Algeria in August 2021, consular relations still remain. As such, the Moroccan consular missions in Algeria continue to operate.)	Oran	Consulate-General		
Algeria	Sidi Bel Abbès	Consulate-General		
Angola	Luanda	Embassy	Countries: Namibia	
Benin	Cotonou	Embassy	Countries: Togo	
Burkina Faso	Ouagadougou	Embassy		
Burundi	Bujumbura	Embassy		
Cameroon	Yaoundé	Embassy		
Cape Verde	Praia	Embassy		
Central African Republic	Bangui	Embassy		
Chad	N'Djamena	Embassy		
Congo-Brazzaville	Brazzaville	Embassy		
Congo-Kinshasa	Kinshasa	Embassy		
Djibouti	Djibouti City	Embassy		
Egypt	Cairo	Embassy	International Organizations: Arab League	
Equatorial Guinea	Malabo	Embassy		
Ethiopia	Addis Ababa	Embassy		
Gabon	Libreville	Embassy	Countries: São Tomé and Príncipe	
Gambia	Banjul	Embassy		
Ghana	Accra	Embassy		
Guinea	Conakry	Embassy	Countries: Liberia; Sierra Leone	
Guinea-Bissau	Bissau	Embassy		
Ivory Coast	Abidjan	Embassy		
Kenya	Nairobi	Embassy	Countries: South Sudan; International Organizations: United Nations; United Nations Environment Programme; United Nations Human Settlements Programme	
Libya	Tripoli	Embassy		
Libya	Benghazi	Consulate-General		
Madagascar	Antananarivo	Embassy	Countries: Mauritius	
Malawi	Lilongwe	Embassy		
Mali	Bamako	Embassy		
Mauritania	Nouakchott	Embassy		
Mauritania	Nouadhibou	Consulate-General		
Mozambique	Maputo	Embassy		
Niger	Niamey	Embassy		
Nigeria	Abuja	Embassy	International Organizations: Economic Community of West African States (Note: Accredited as an observer mission.)	
Rwanda	Kigali	Embassy		
Senegal	Dakar	Embassy		
South Africa	Pretoria	Embassy	Countries: Botswana; Eswatini	
Sudan	Khartoum	Embassy		
Tanzania	Dar es Salaam	Embassy	Countries: Comoros; Uganda	
Togo	Lomé	Embassy office (Note: Subordinate to the embassy in Cotonou)		
Tunisia	Tunis	Embassy		
Zambia	Lusaka	Embassy		

=== Americas ===
Host country	Host city	Mission	Concurrent accreditation	Ref.
Argentina	Buenos Aires	Embassy	Countries: Uruguay	
Brazil	Brasília	Embassy	Countries: Guyana; Suriname	
Canada	Ottawa	Embassy		
Canada	Montreal	Consulate-General		
Canada	Toronto	Consulate-General		
Chile	Santiago de Chile	Embassy		
Colombia	Bogotá	Embassy	Countries: Ecuador	
Cuba	Havana	Embassy		
Dominican Republic	Santo Domingo	Embassy	Countries: Haiti	
El Salvador	San Salvador	Embassy		
Guatemala	Guatemala City	Embassy	Countries: Costa Rica; Honduras; Nicaragua	
Mexico	Mexico City	Embassy	Countries: Belize	
Panama	Panama City	Embassy		
Paraguay	Asunción	Embassy		
Peru	Lima	Embassy	Countries: Bolivia	
Saint Lucia	Gros Islet	Embassy	Countries: Bahamas; Antigua and Barbuda; Barbados; Dominica; Grenada; Jamaica; Saint Kitts and Nevis; Saint Vincent and the Grenadines; Trinidad and Tobago; International Organizations: Organisation of Eastern Caribbean States	
United States	Washington, D.C.	Embassy	International Organizations: Organization of American States	
United States	Miami	Consulate-General	International Organizations: Organization of American States	
United States	New York City	Consulate-General	International Organizations: Organization of American States	

=== Asia ===
Host country	Host city	Mission	Concurrent accreditation	Ref.
Azerbaijan	Baku	Embassy	Countries: Uzbekistan	
Bahrain	Manama	Embassy		
Bangladesh	Dhaka	Embassy		
China	Beijing	Embassy	Countries: Mongolia	
India	New Delhi	Embassy	Countries: Bhutan; Maldives; Nepal; Sri Lanka	
Indonesia	Jakarta	Embassy	Countries: Singapore; International Organizations: Association of Southeast Asian Nations	
Iraq	Baghdad	Embassy		
Israel	Tel Aviv	Liaison office (Note: Subordinate to the embassy in Amman)		
Japan	Tokyo	Embassy		
Jordan	Amman	Embassy		
Kazakhstan	Astana	Embassy	Countries: Kyrgyzstan; Tajikistan; Turkmenistan	
Kuwait	Kuwait City	Embassy		
Lebanon	Beirut	Embassy		
Malaysia	Kuala Lumpur	Embassy	Countries: Brunei	
Oman	Muscat	Embassy		
Pakistan	Islamabad	Embassy	Countries: Afghanistan	
Palestine	Ramallah	Representative office		
Philippines	Manila	Embassy	Countries: Micronesia; Palau	
Qatar	Doha	Embassy		
Saudi Arabia	Riyadh	Embassy	International Organizations: Organisation of Islamic Cooperation	
Saudi Arabia	Jeddah	Consulate-General	International Organizations: Organisation of Islamic Cooperation	
South Korea	Seoul	Embassy		
Syria	Damascus	Embassy		
Thailand	Bangkok	Embassy	Countries: Cambodia; Laos; Myanmar	
Turkey	Ankara	Embassy		
Turkey	Istanbul	Consulate-General		
United Arab Emirates	Abu Dhabi	Embassy		
United Arab Emirates	Dubai	Consulate-General		
Vietnam	Hanoi	Embassy		

=== Europe ===
Host country	Host city	Mission	Concurrent accreditation	Ref.
Austria	Vienna	Embassy	Countries: Slovakia; International Organizations: International Atomic Energy Agency; United Nations	
Belgium	Brussels	Embassy	Countries: Luxembourg	
Belgium	Antwerp	Consulate-General	Countries: Luxembourg	
Belgium	Liège	Consulate-General	Countries: Luxembourg	
Bulgaria	Sofia	Embassy	Countries: North Macedonia	
Croatia	Zagreb	Embassy	Countries: Bosnia and Herzegovina	
Czech Republic	Prague	Embassy		
Denmark	Copenhagen	Embassy	Countries: Lithuania	
Finland	Helsinki	Embassy	Countries: Estonia	
France	Paris	Embassy	Countries: Monaco	
France	Paris	Consulate-General	Countries: Monaco	
France	Bastia	Consulate-General	Countries: Monaco	
France	Bordeaux	Consulate-General	Countries: Monaco	
France	Colombes	Consulate-General	Countries: Monaco	
France	Dijon	Consulate-General	Countries: Monaco	
France	Lille	Consulate-General	Countries: Monaco	
France	Lyon	Consulate-General	Countries: Monaco	
France	Marseille	Consulate-General	Countries: Monaco	
France	Montpellier	Consulate-General	Countries: Monaco	
France	Orléans	Consulate-General	Countries: Monaco	
France	Orly	Consulate-General	Countries: Monaco	
France	Pontoise	Consulate-General	Countries: Monaco	
France	Rennes	Consulate-General	Countries: Monaco	
France	Strasbourg	Consulate-General	Countries: Monaco	
France	Toulouse	Consulate-General	Countries: Monaco	
France	Villemomble	Consulate-General	Countries: Monaco	
Germany	Berlin	Embassy		
Germany	Düsseldorf	Consulate-General		
Germany	Frankfurt	Consulate-General		
Greece	Athens	Embassy	Countries: Cyprus	
Holy See	Rome	Embassy (Note: The Moroccan Embassy to the Holy See is located outside Vatican territory in Rome.)	Sovereign Entity: Sovereign Military Order of Malta	
Hungary	Budapest	Embassy		
Ireland	Dublin	Embassy		
Italy	Rome	Embassy	Countries: Albania; Malta; San Marino; International Organizations: Food and Agriculture Organization; International Fund for Agricultural Development; World Food Programme	
Italy	Bologna	Consulate-General	Countries: Albania; Malta; San Marino; International Organizations: Food and Agriculture Organization; International Fund for Agricultural Development; World Food Programme	
Italy	Milan	Consulate-General	Countries: Albania; Malta; San Marino; International Organizations: Food and Agriculture Organization; International Fund for Agricultural Development; World Food Programme	
Italy	Naples	Consulate-General	Countries: Albania; Malta; San Marino; International Organizations: Food and Agriculture Organization; International Fund for Agricultural Development; World Food Programme	
Italy	Palermo	Consulate-General	Countries: Albania; Malta; San Marino; International Organizations: Food and Agriculture Organization; International Fund for Agricultural Development; World Food Programme	
Italy	Turin	Consulate-General	Countries: Albania; Malta; San Marino; International Organizations: Food and Agriculture Organization; International Fund for Agricultural Development; World Food Programme	
Italy	Verona	Consulate-General	Countries: Albania; Malta; San Marino; International Organizations: Food and Agriculture Organization; International Fund for Agricultural Development; World Food Programme	
Netherlands	The Hague	Embassy	International Organizations: OPCW	
Netherlands	Amsterdam	Consulate-General	International Organizations: OPCW	
Netherlands	's-Hertogenbosch	Consulate-General	International Organizations: OPCW	
Netherlands	Rotterdam	Consulate-General	International Organizations: OPCW	
Netherlands	Utrecht	Consulate-General	International Organizations: OPCW	
Norway	Oslo	Embassy	Countries: Iceland	
Poland	Warsaw	Embassy		
Portugal	Lisbon	Embassy		
Romania	Bucharest	Embassy	Countries: Moldova	
Russia	Moscow	Embassy	Countries: Belarus	
Serbia	Belgrade	Embassy	Countries: Montenegro	
Slovenia	Ljubljana	Embassy		
Spain	Madrid	Embassy		
Spain	Algeciras	Consulate-General		
Spain	Almería	Consulate-General		
Spain	Barcelona	Consulate-General		
Spain	Bilbao	Consulate-General		
Spain	Girona	Consulate-General		
Spain	Las Palmas de Gran Canaria	Consulate-General		
Spain	Murcia	Consulate-General		
Spain	Palma de Mallorca	Consulate-General		
Spain	Seville	Consulate-General		
Spain	Tarragona	Consulate-General		
Spain	Valencia	Consulate-General		
Sweden	Stockholm	Embassy	Countries: Latvia	
Switzerland	Bern	Embassy	Countries: Liechtenstein	
Ukraine	Kyiv	Embassy	Countries: Armenia; Georgia	
United Kingdom	London	Embassy		

=== Oceania ===
Host country	Host city	Mission	Concurrent accreditation	Ref.
Australia	Canberra	Embassy	Countries: Fiji; Kiribati; Nauru; New Zealand; Papua New Guinea; Samoa; Solomon Islands; Tonga; Tuvalu; Vanuatu	

=== Multilateral organisations ===
Organization	Host city	Host country	Mission	Concurrent accreditation	Ref.
African Union	Addis Ababa	Ethiopia	Permanent Mission		
European Union	Brussels	Belgium	Permanent Mission	International Organizations: NATO	
United Nations	New York City	United States	Permanent Mission		
United Nations	Geneva	Switzerland	Permanent Mission		
IAEA	Vienna	Austria	Permanent Mission		
UNESCO	Paris	France	Permanent Mission		

== Gallery ==
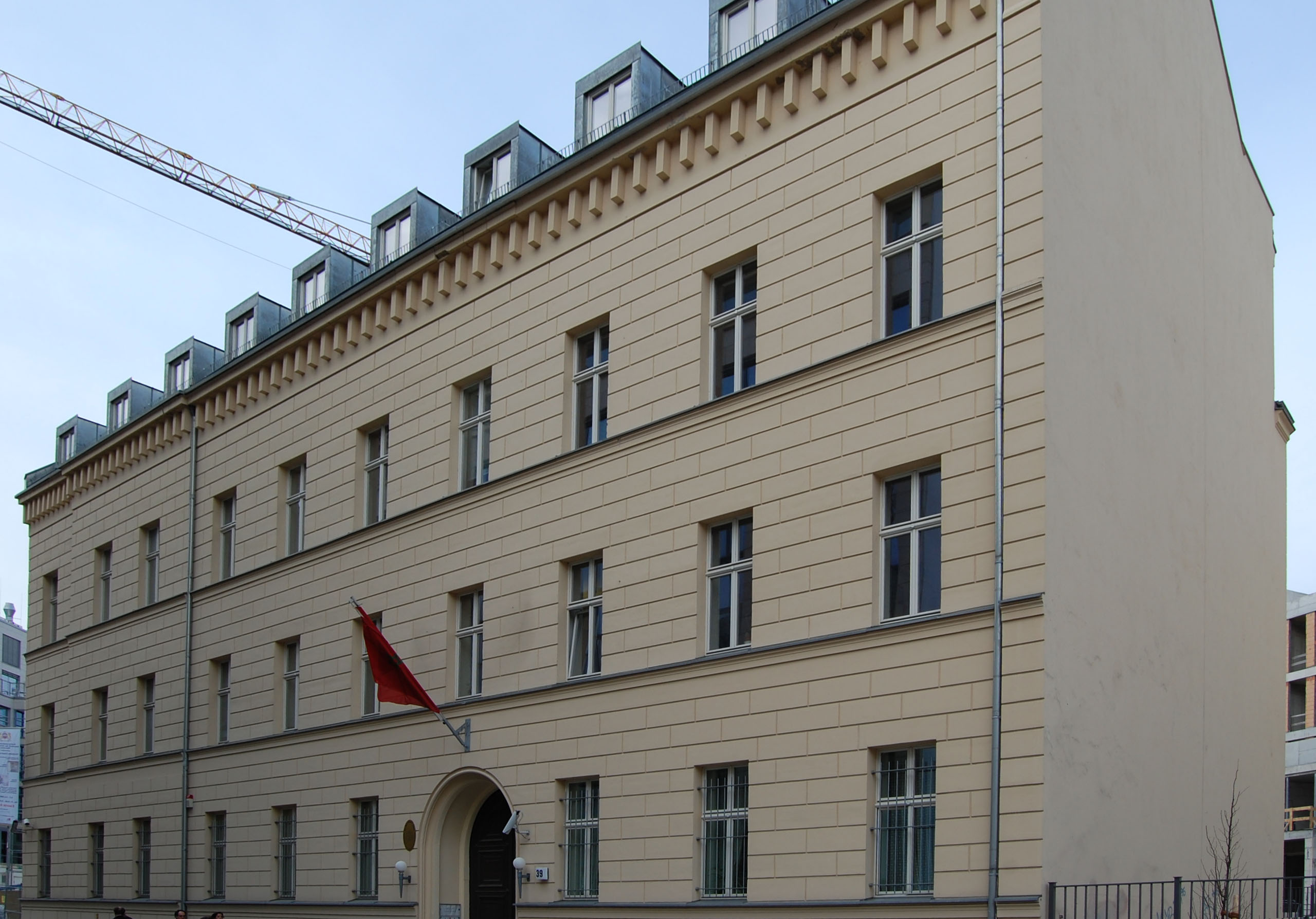
Embassy in Berlin

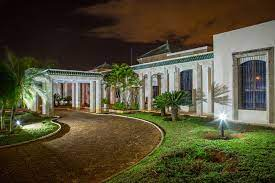
Embassy in Brasília

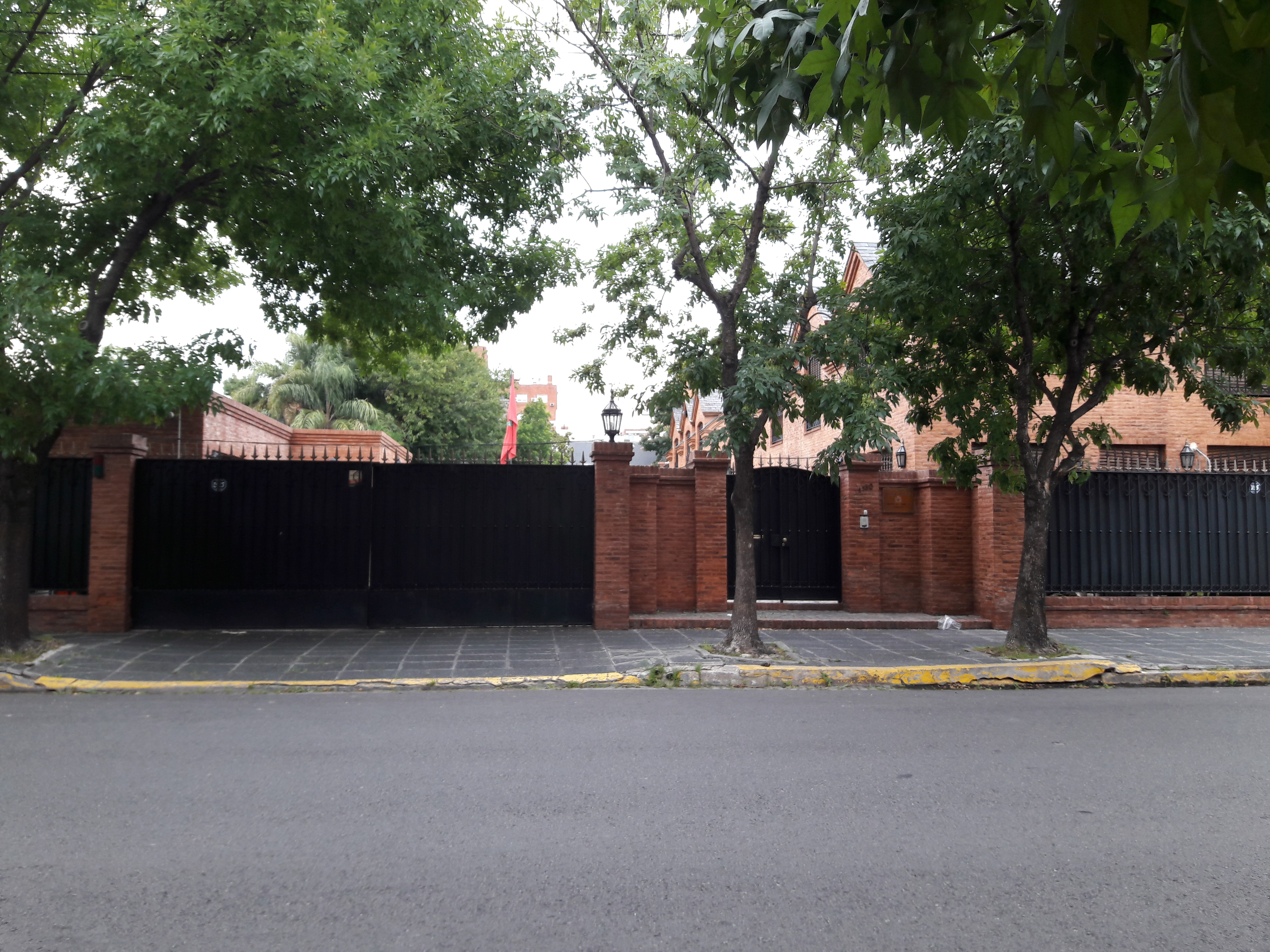
Embassy in Buenos Aires

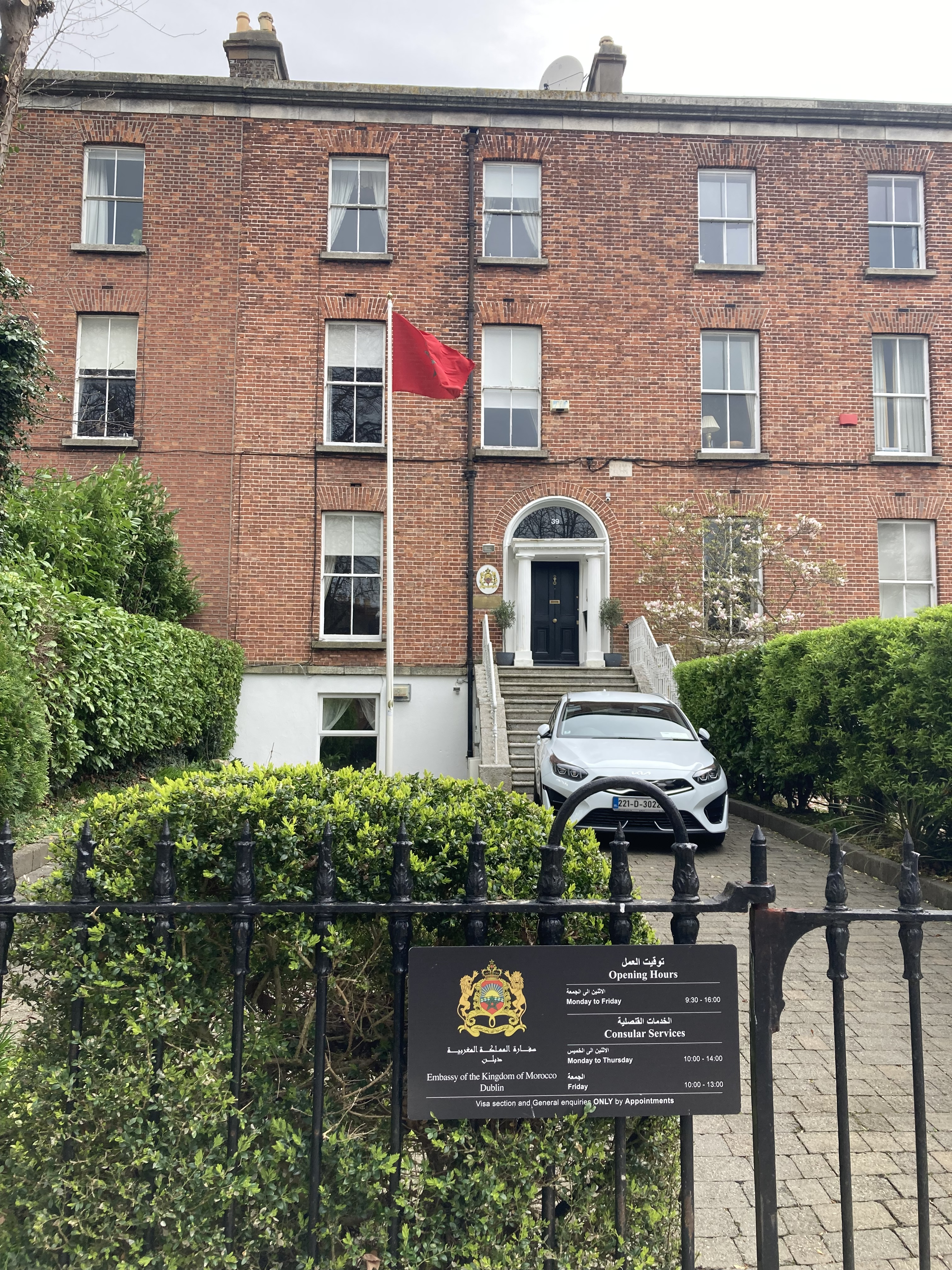
Embassy in Dublin

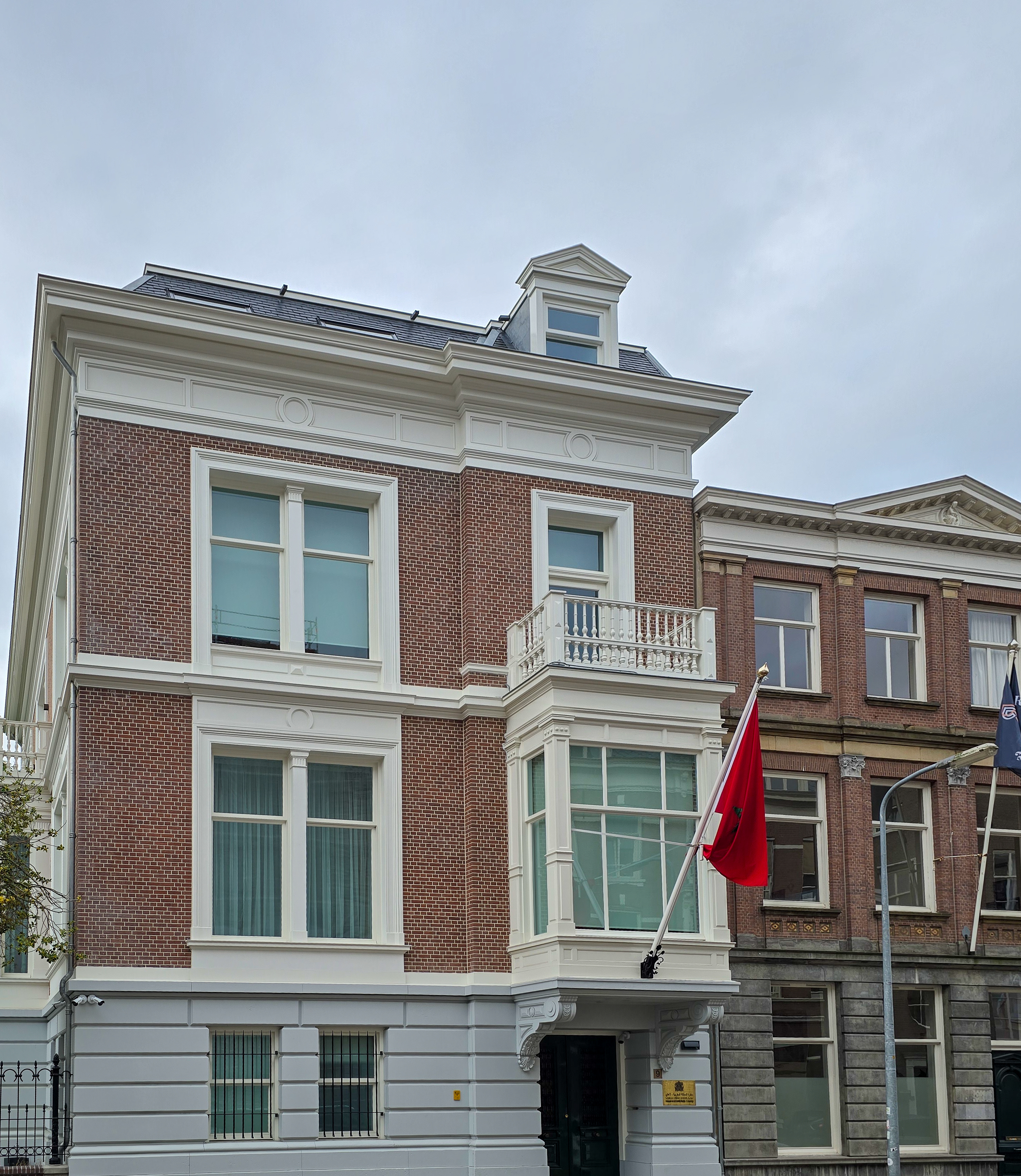
Embassy in The Hague

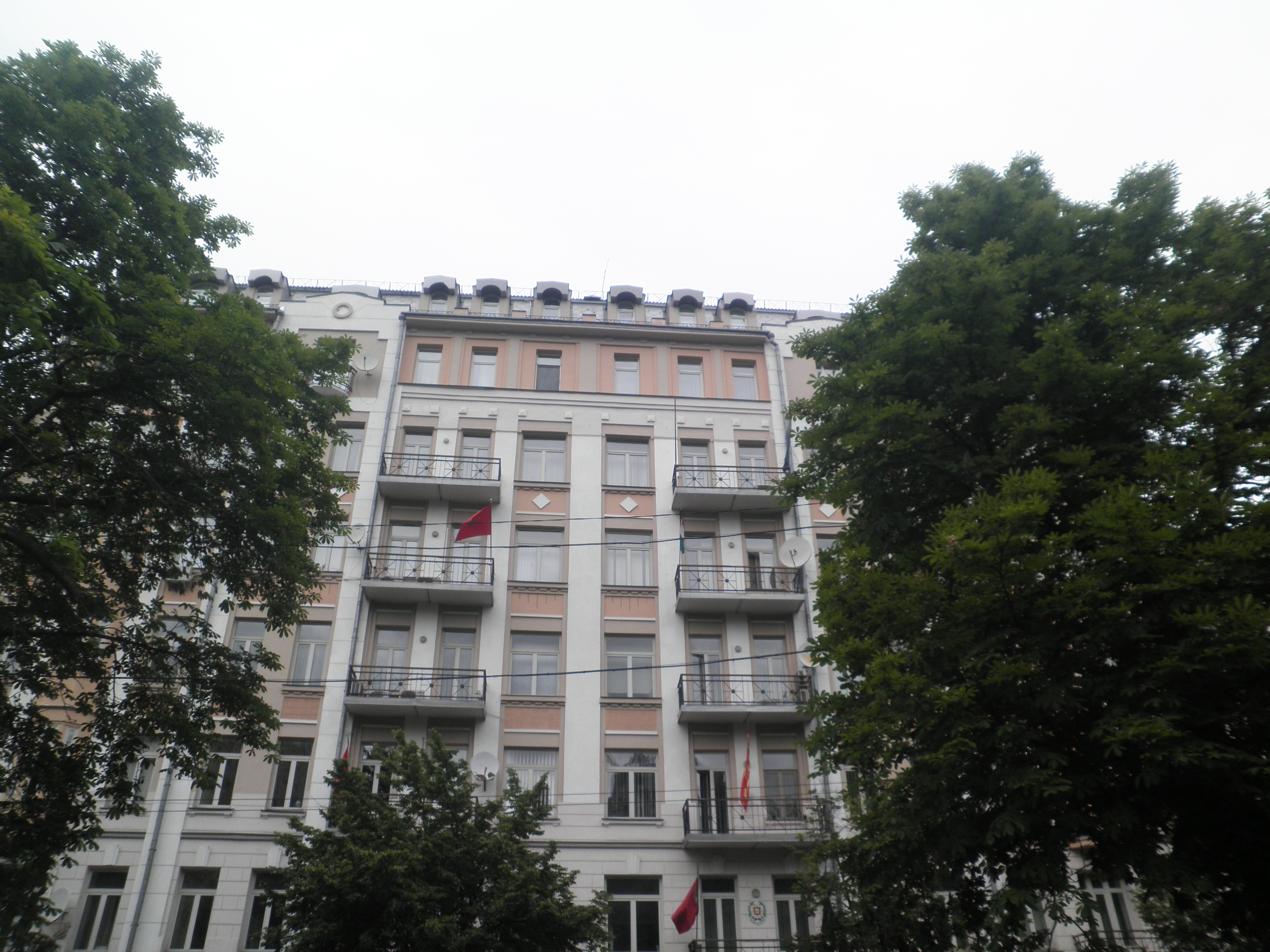
Embassy in Kyiv

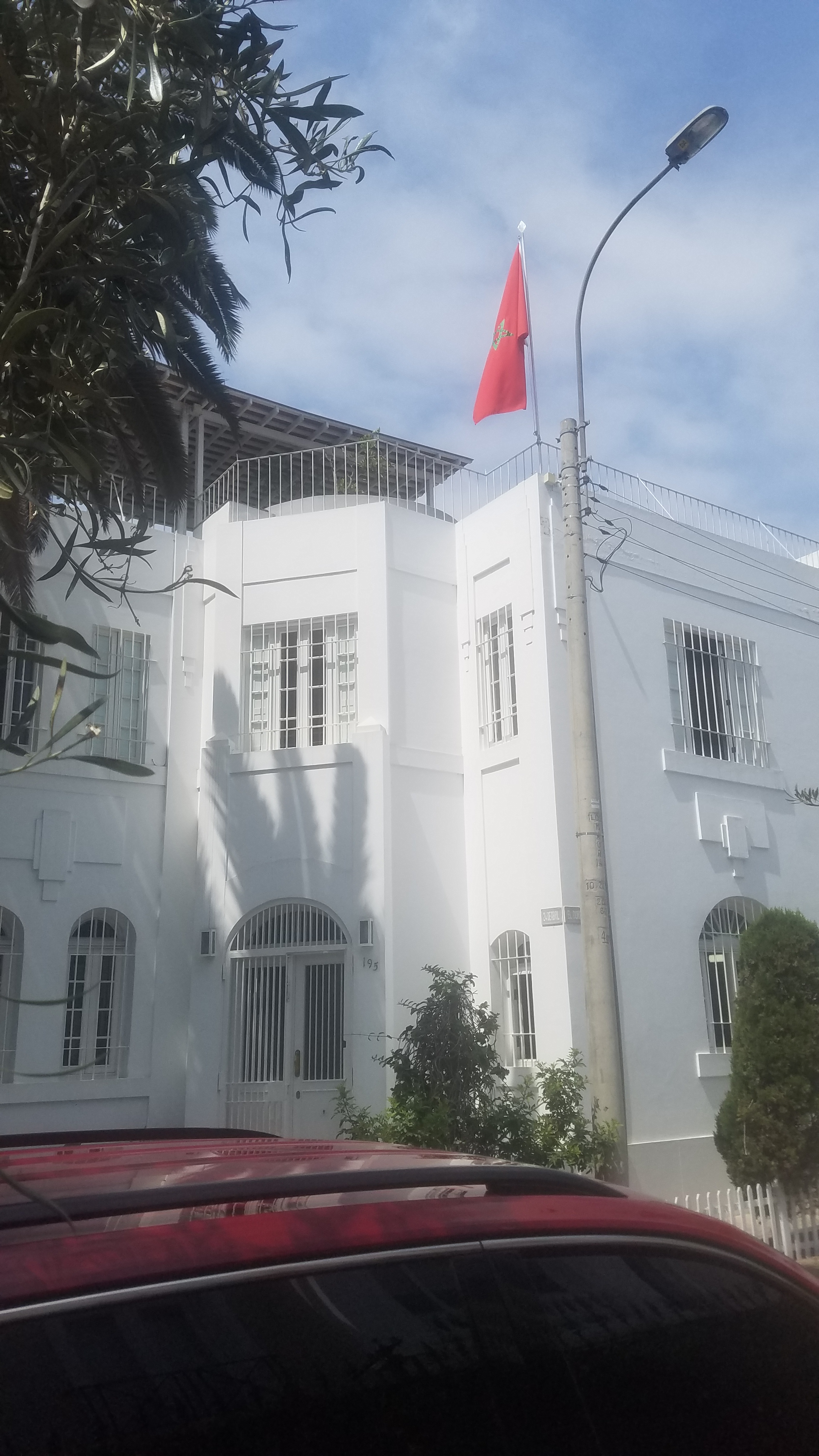
Embassy in Lima

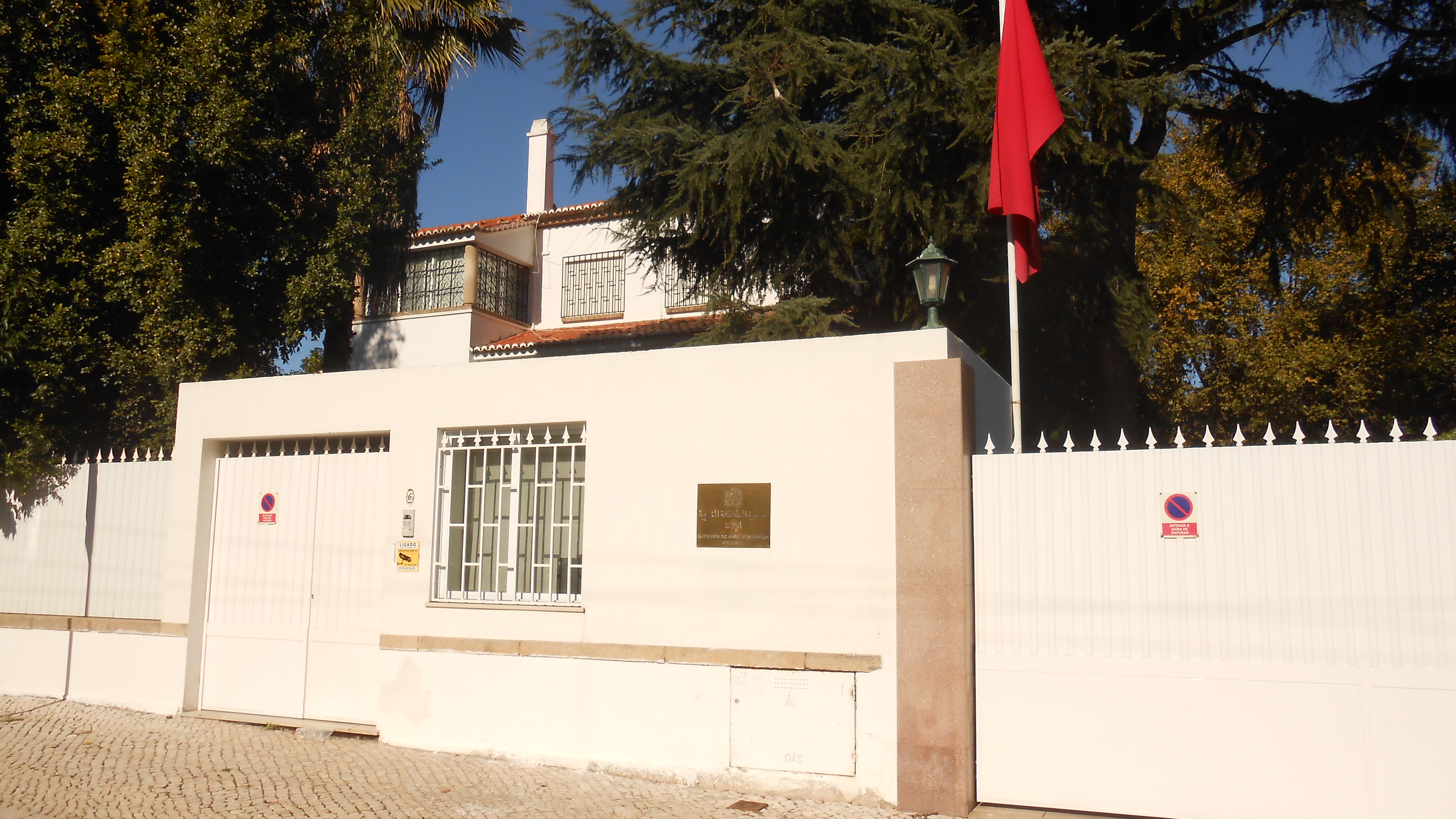
Embassy in Lisbon

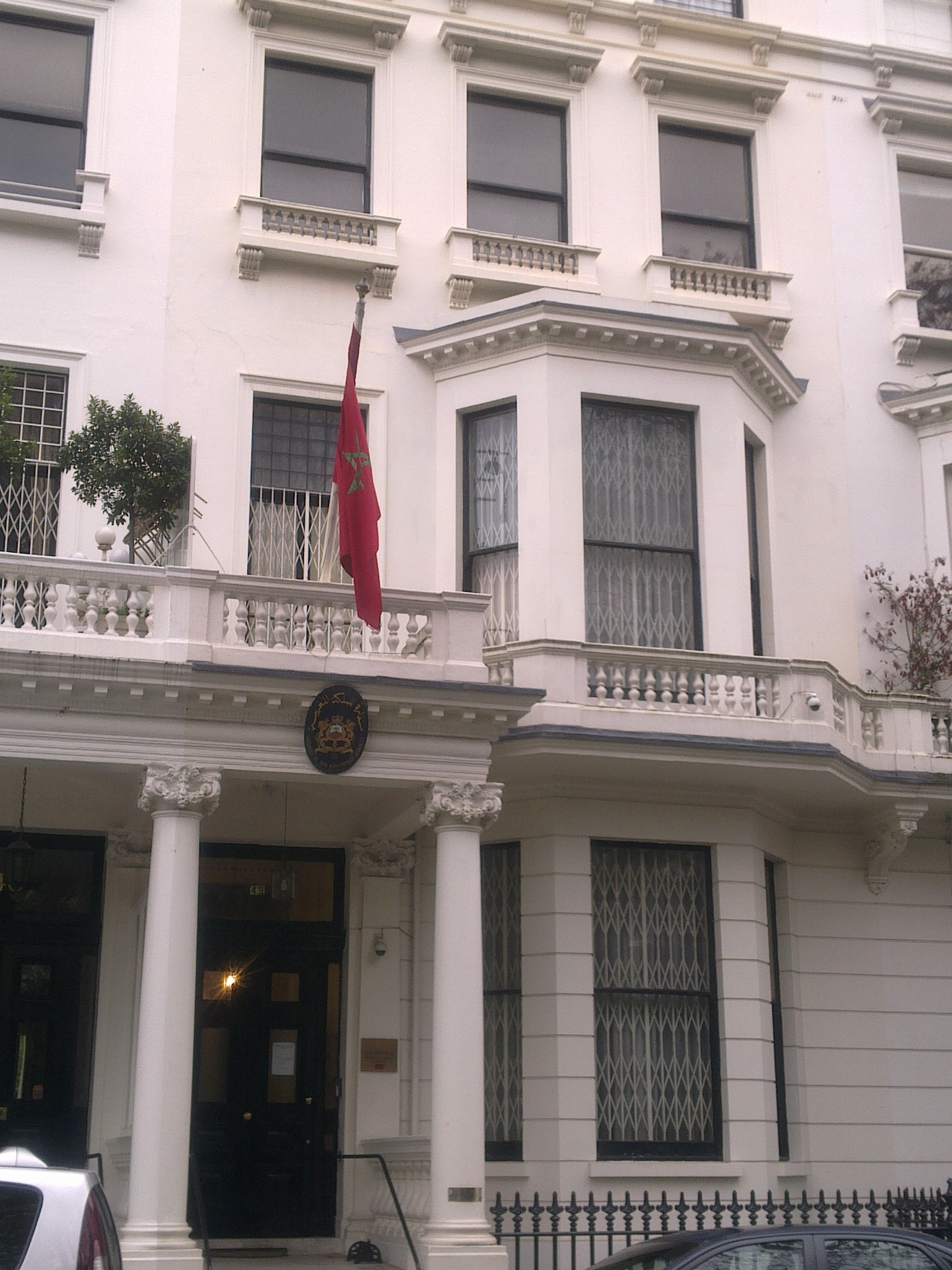
Embassy in London

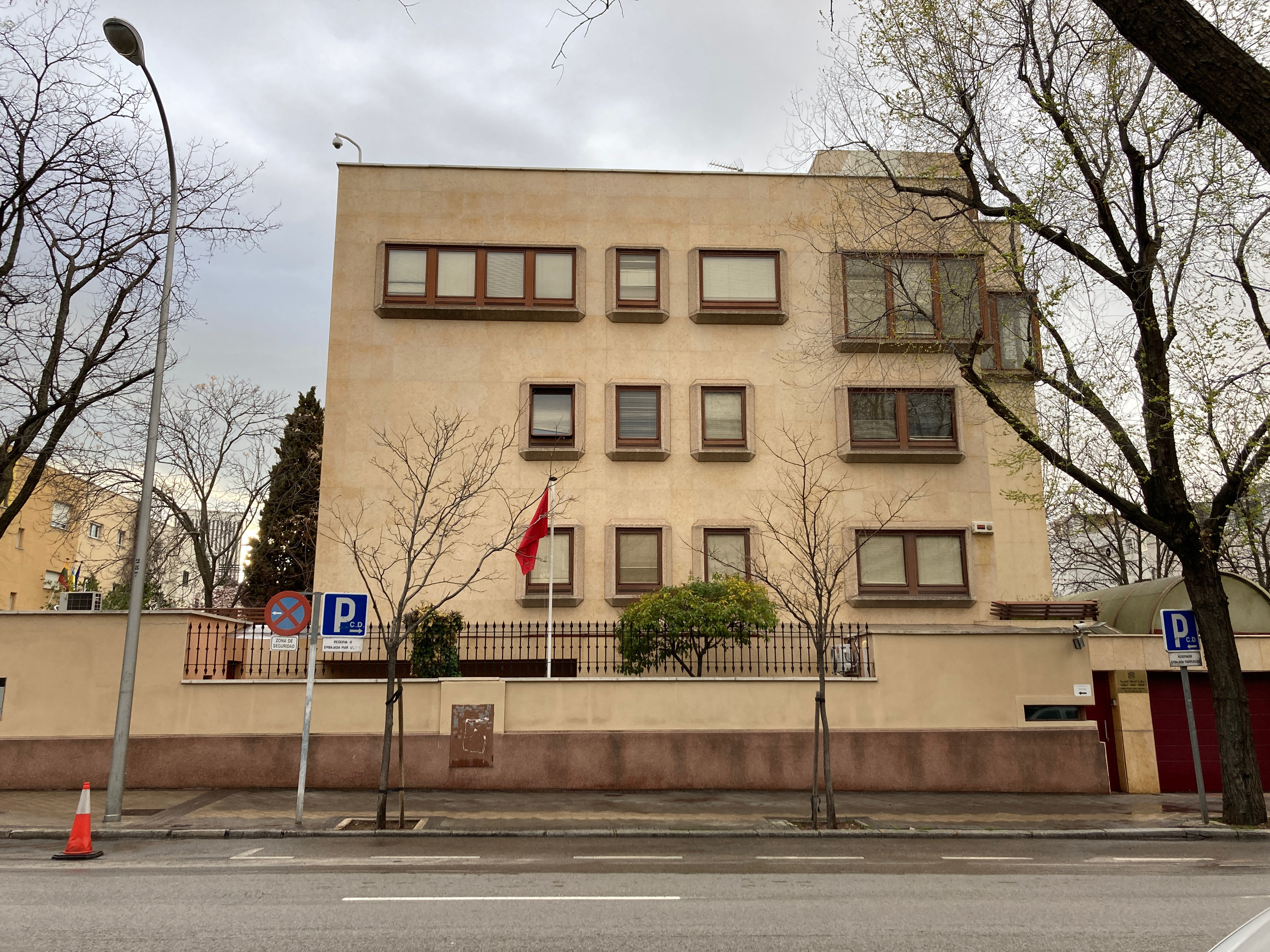
Embassy in Madrid

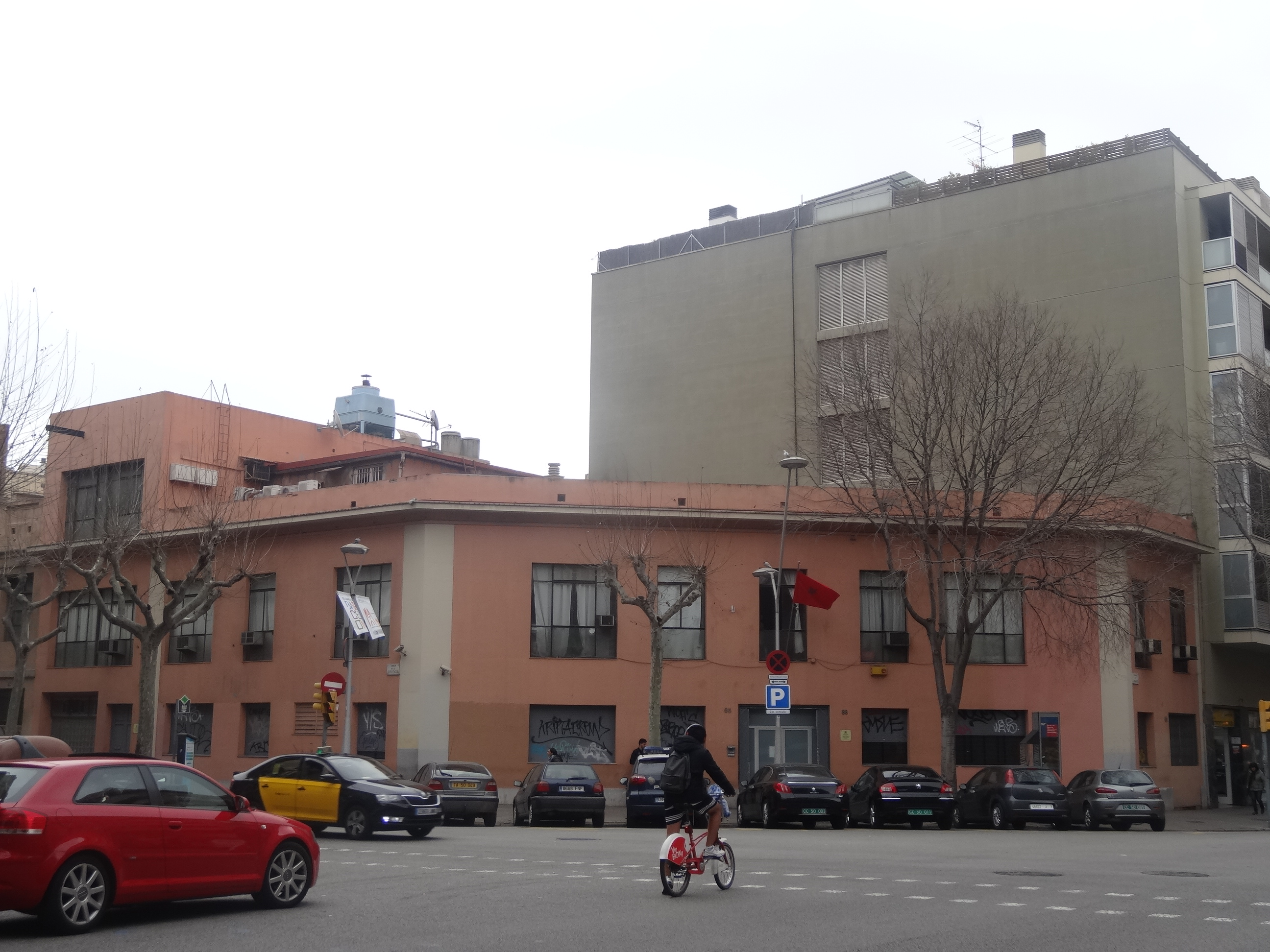
Consulate-General in Barcelona

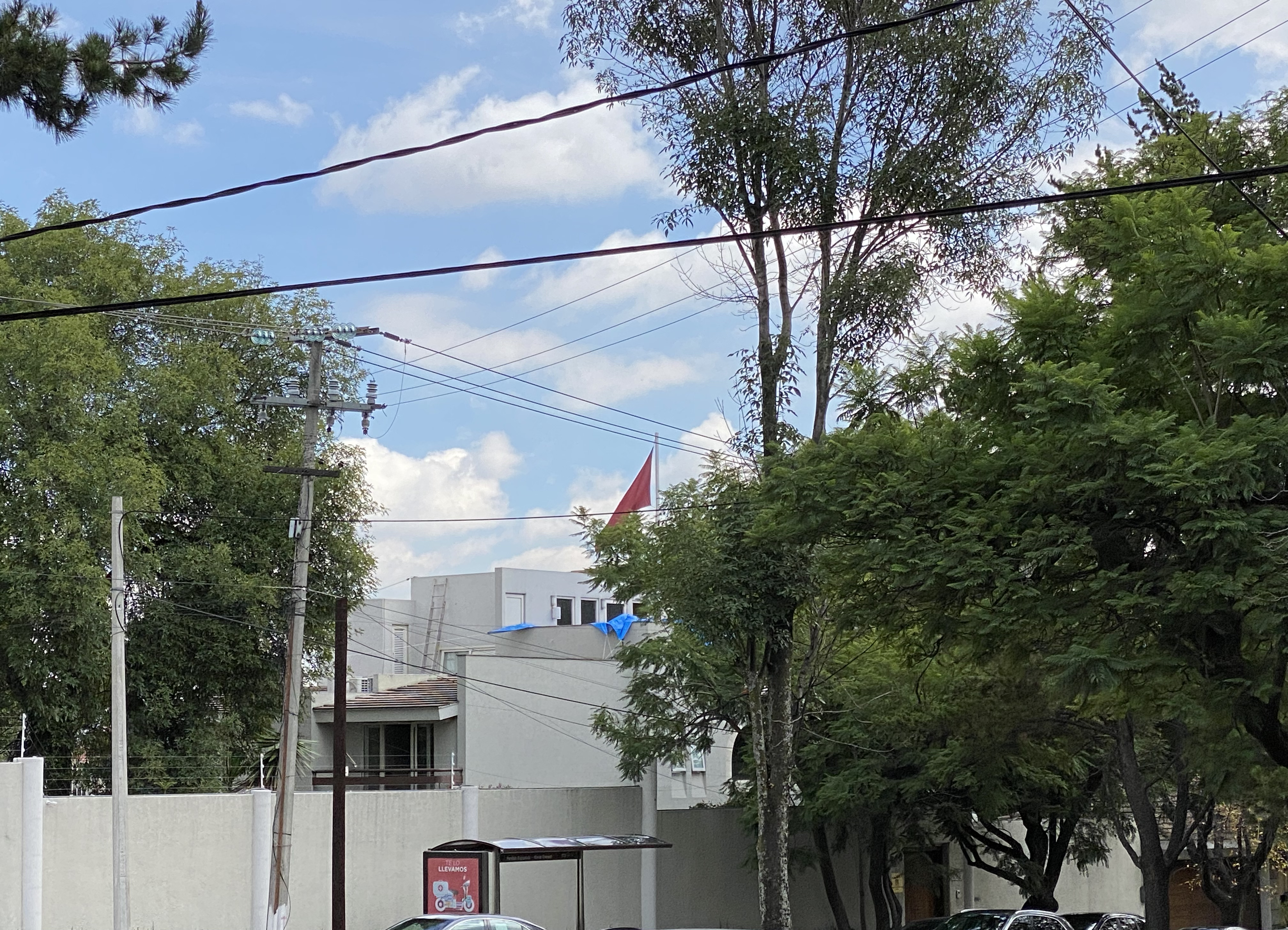
Embassy in Mexico City

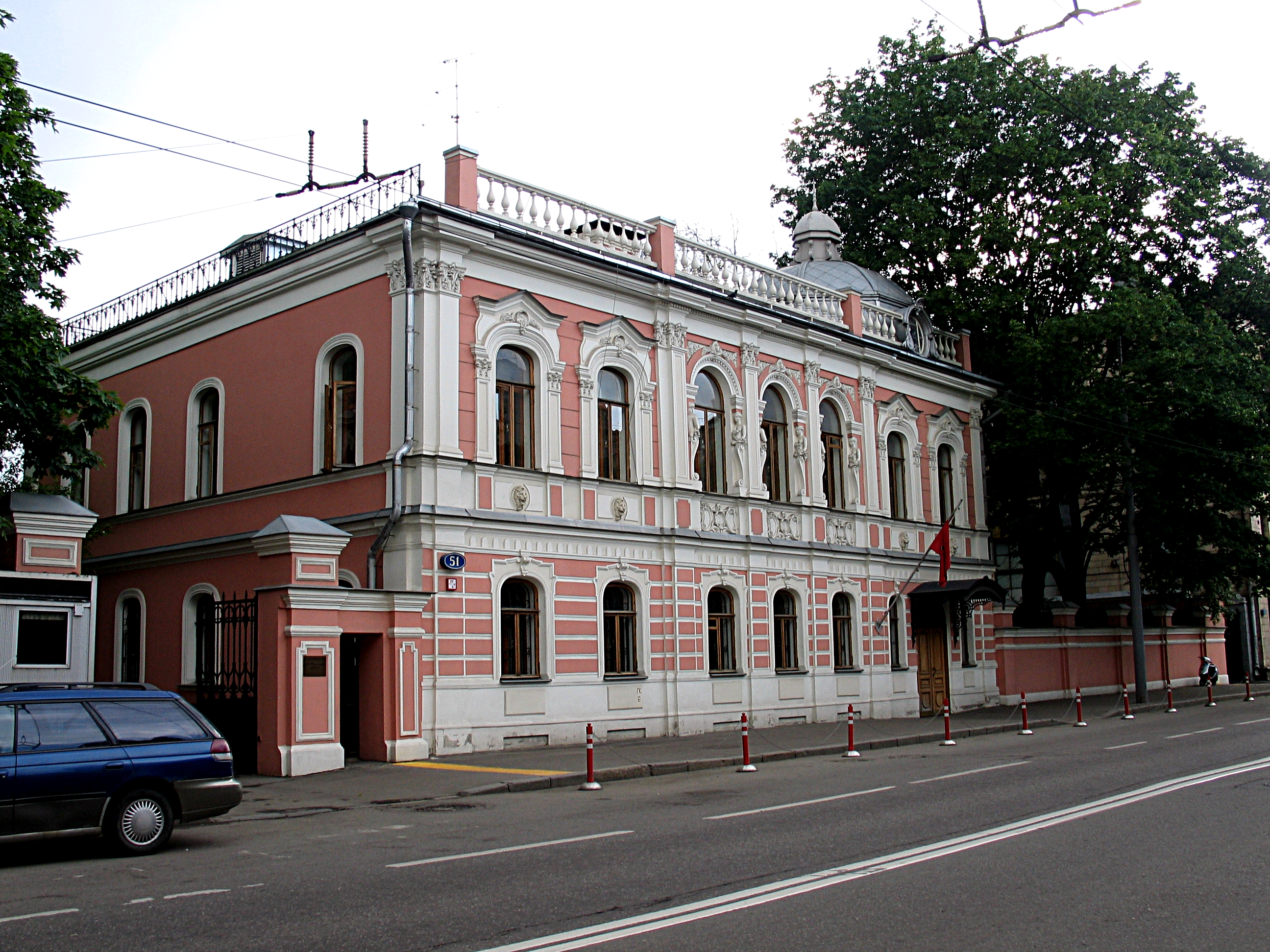
Embassy in Moscow

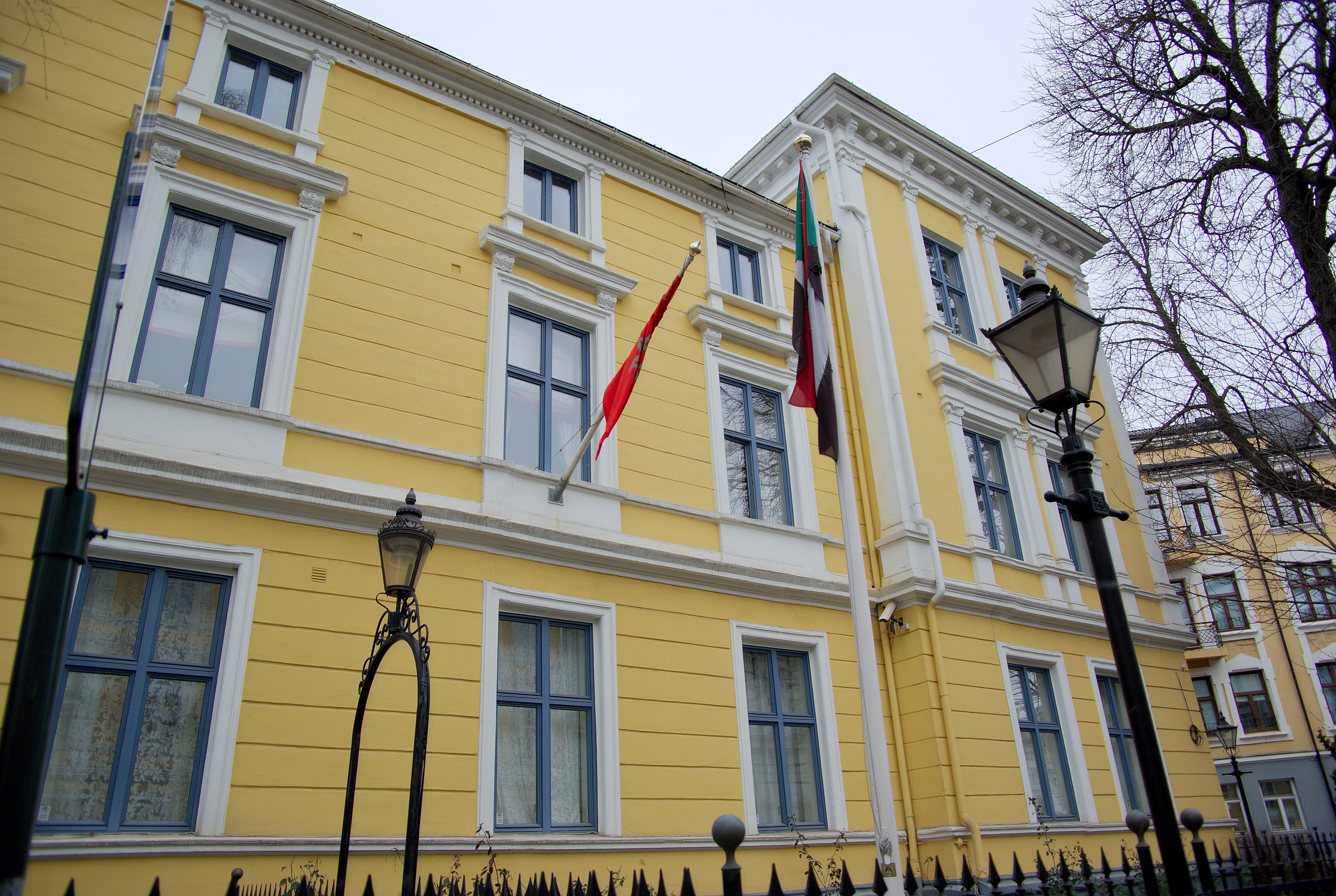
Embassy in Oslo

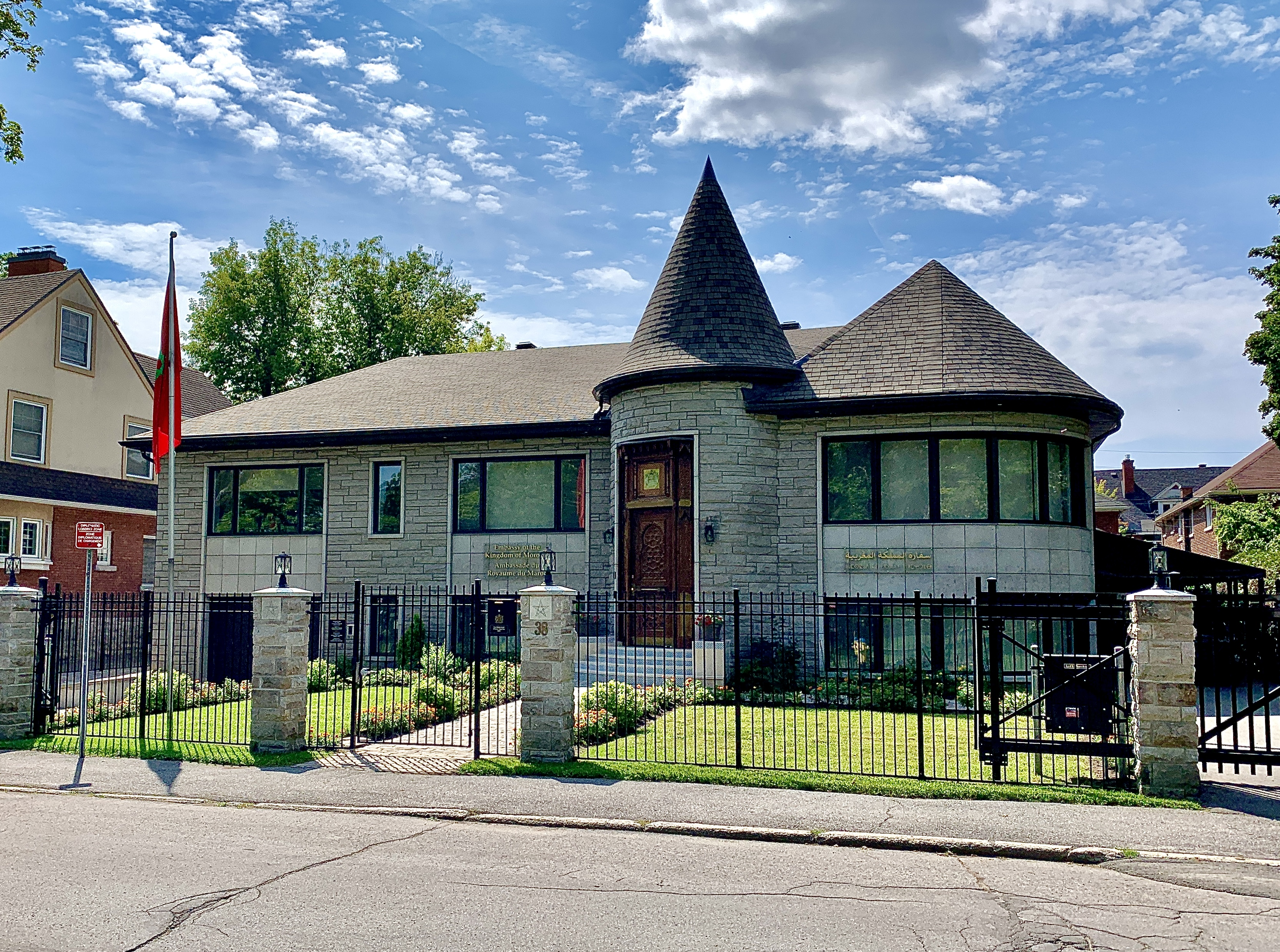
Embassy in Ottawa

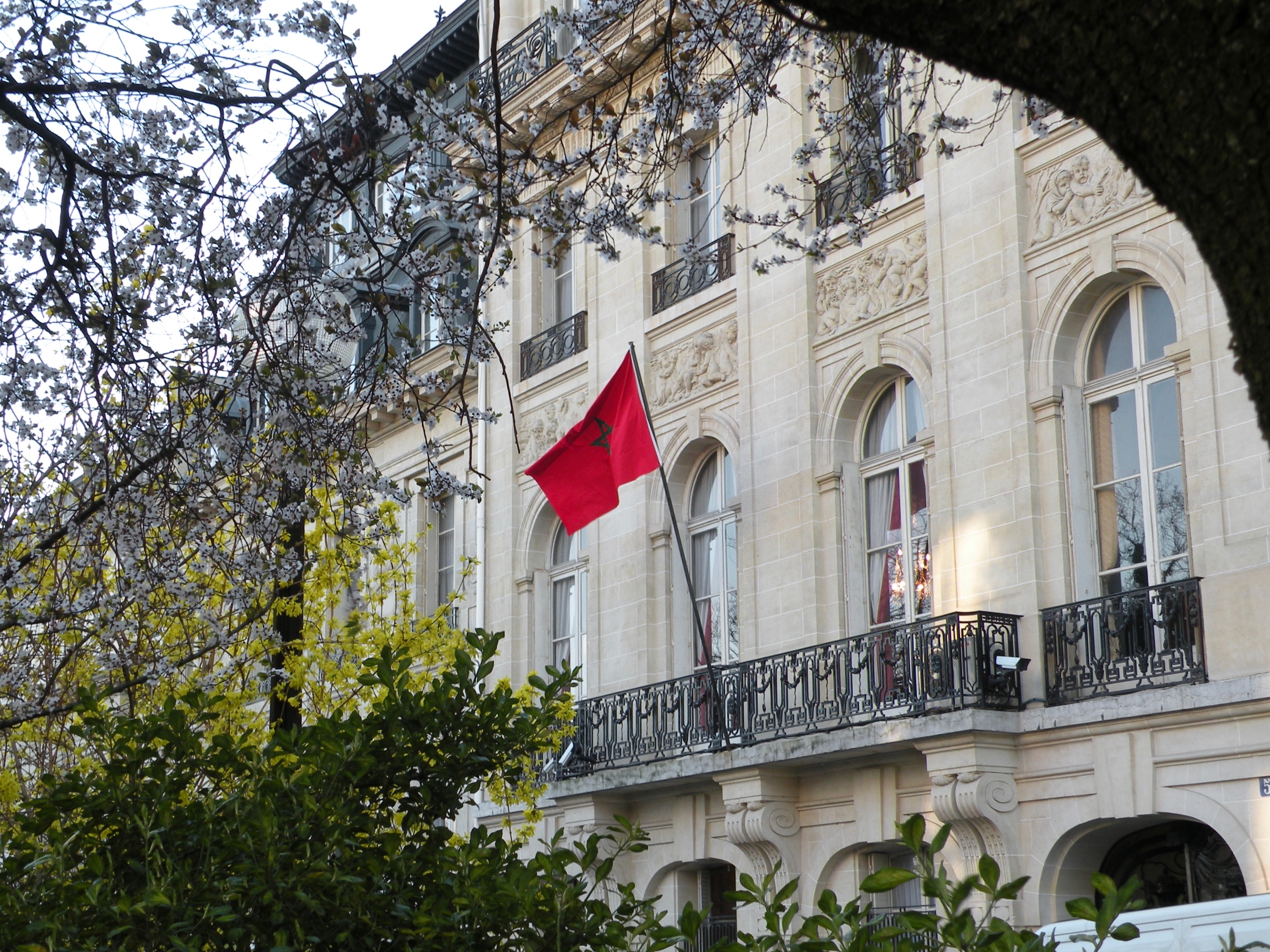
Embassy in Paris

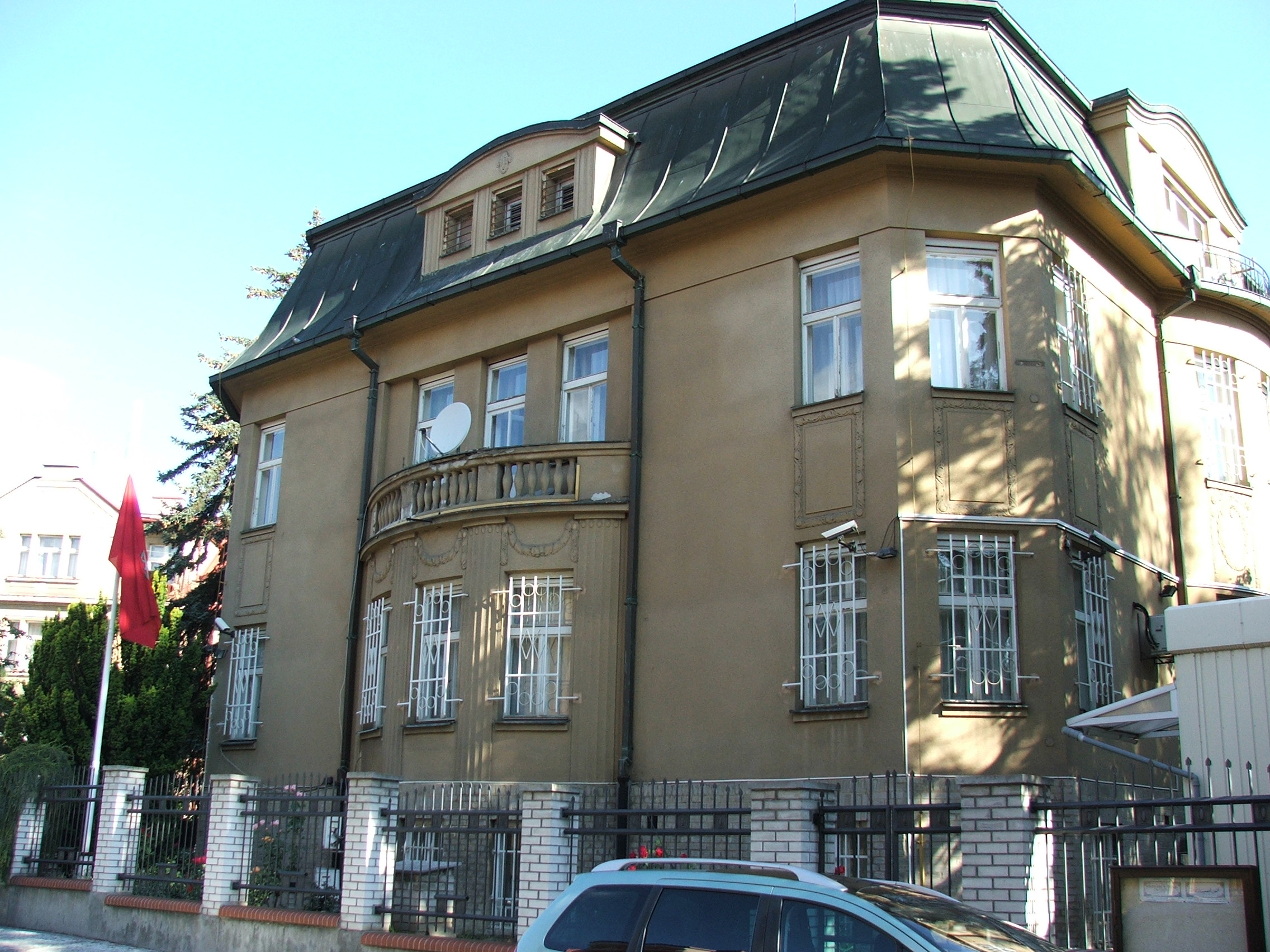
Embassy in Prague

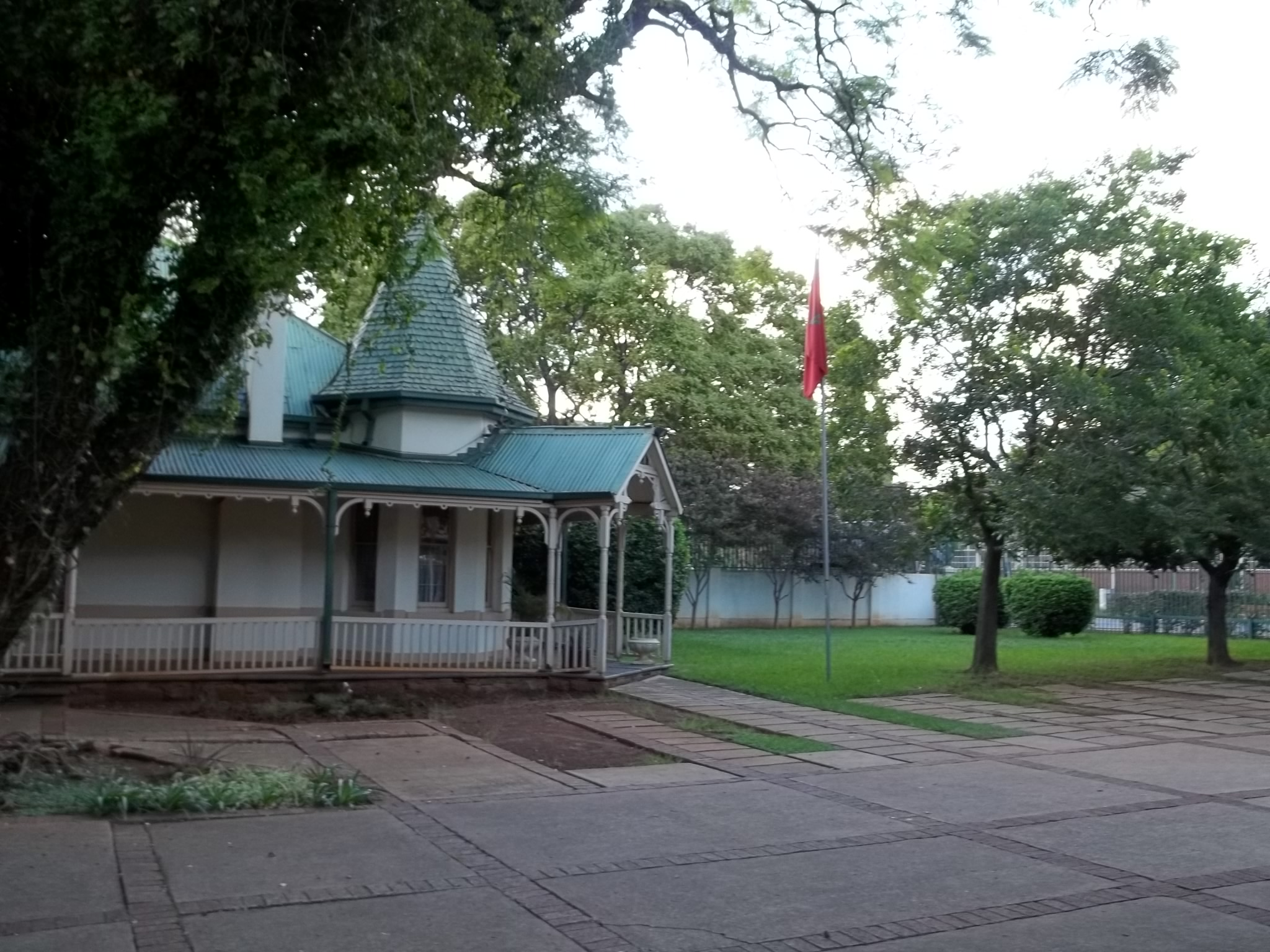
Embassy in Pretoria

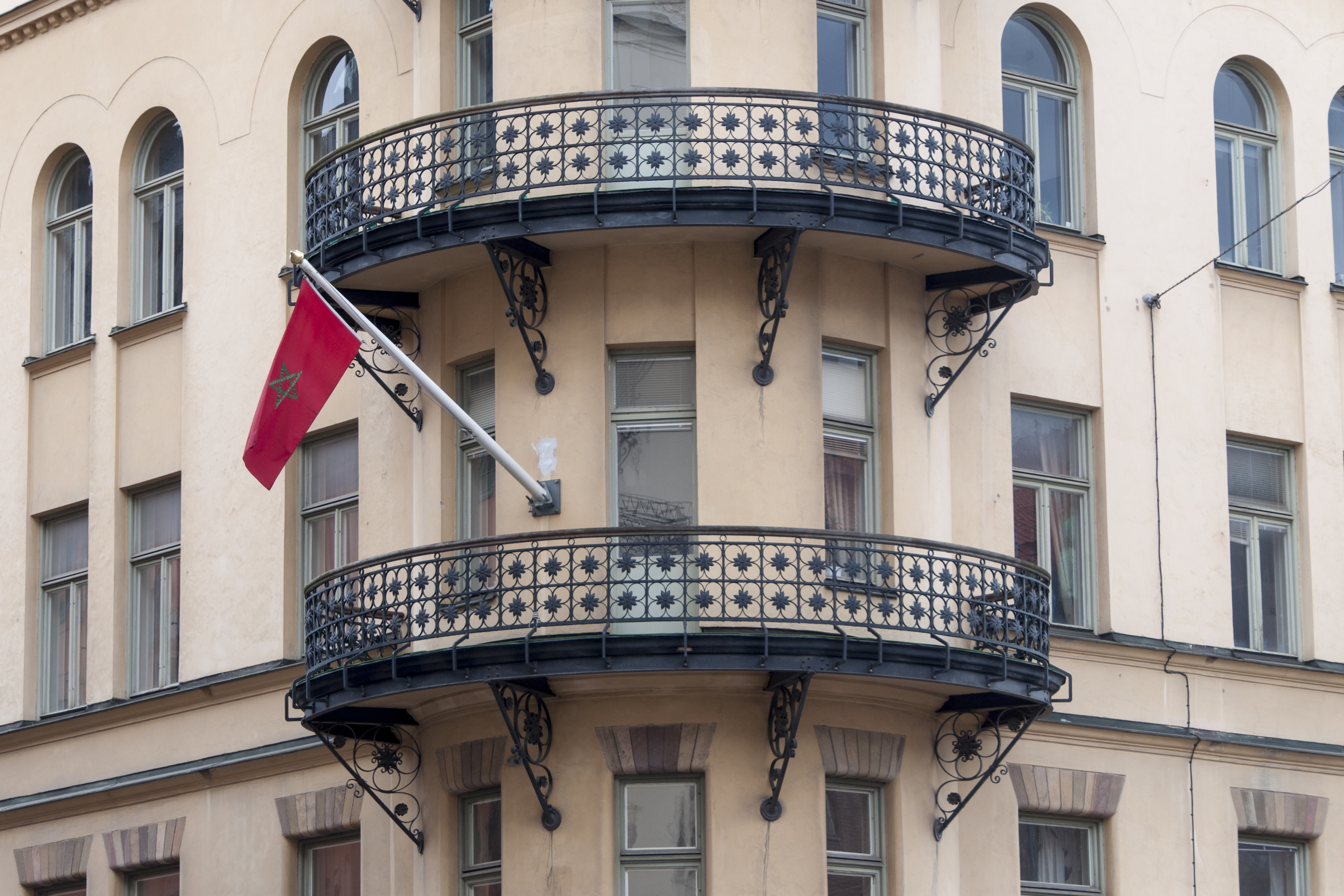
Embassy in Stockholm

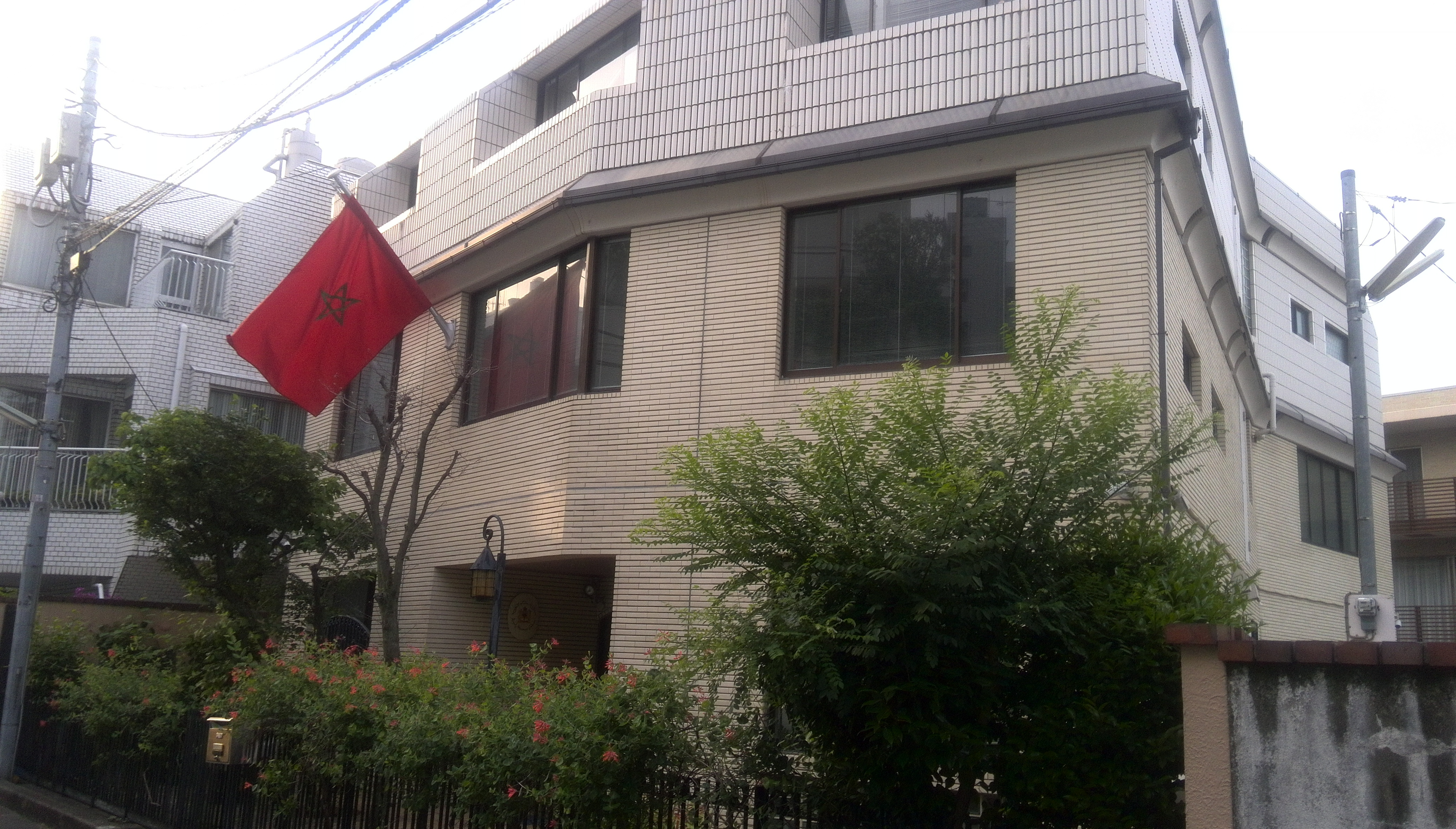
Embassy in Tokyo

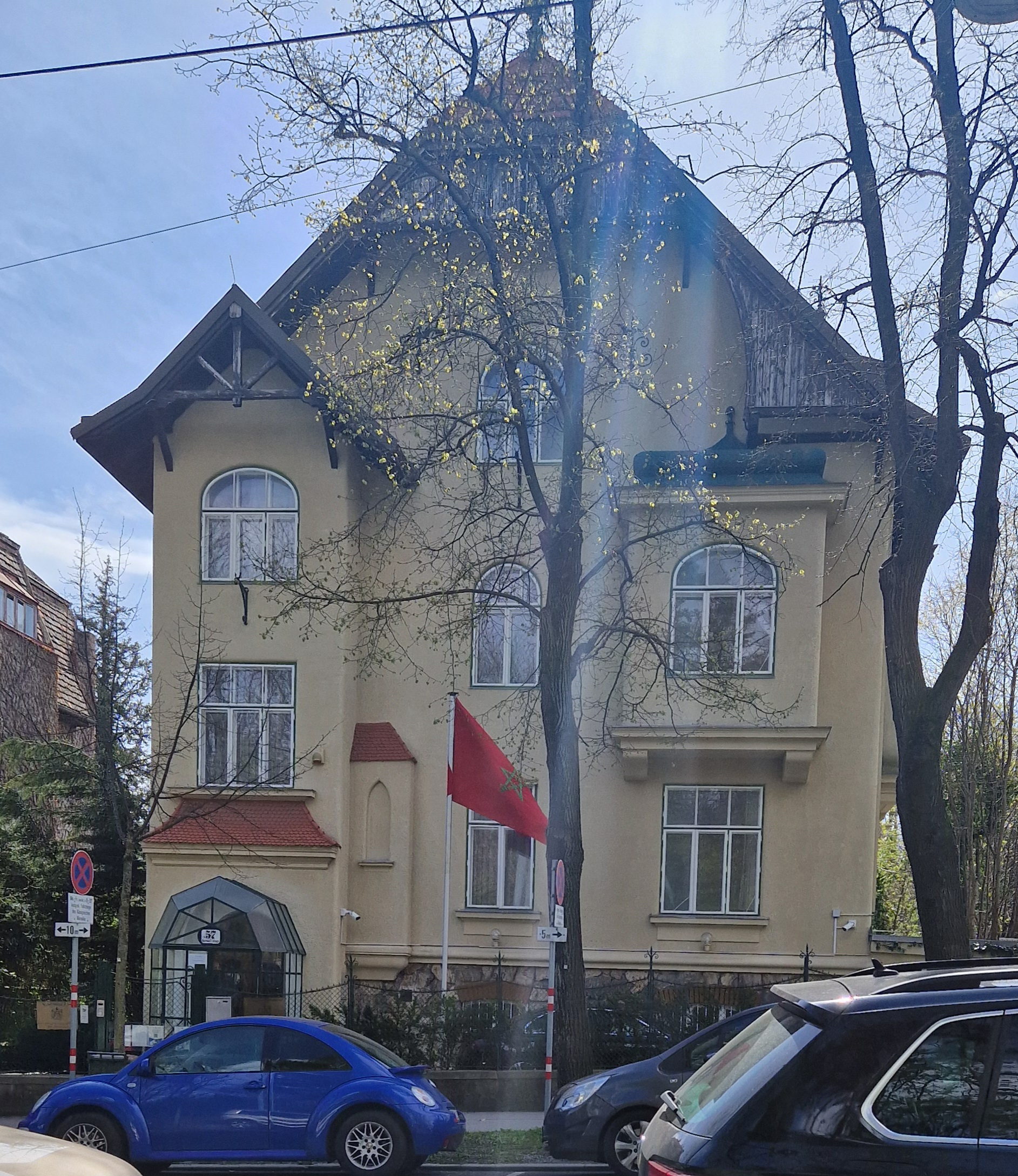
Embassy in Vienna

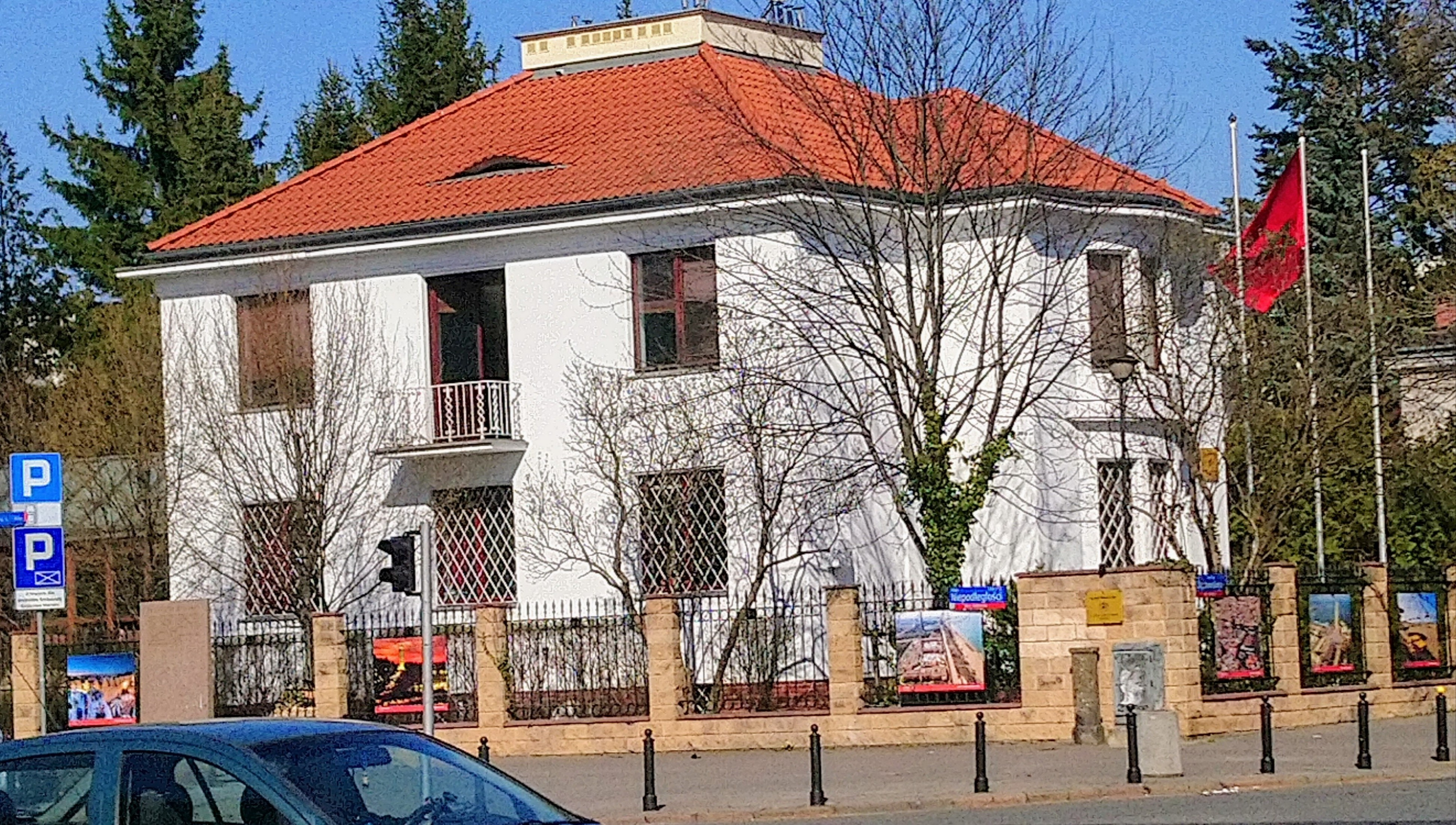
Embassy in Warsaw

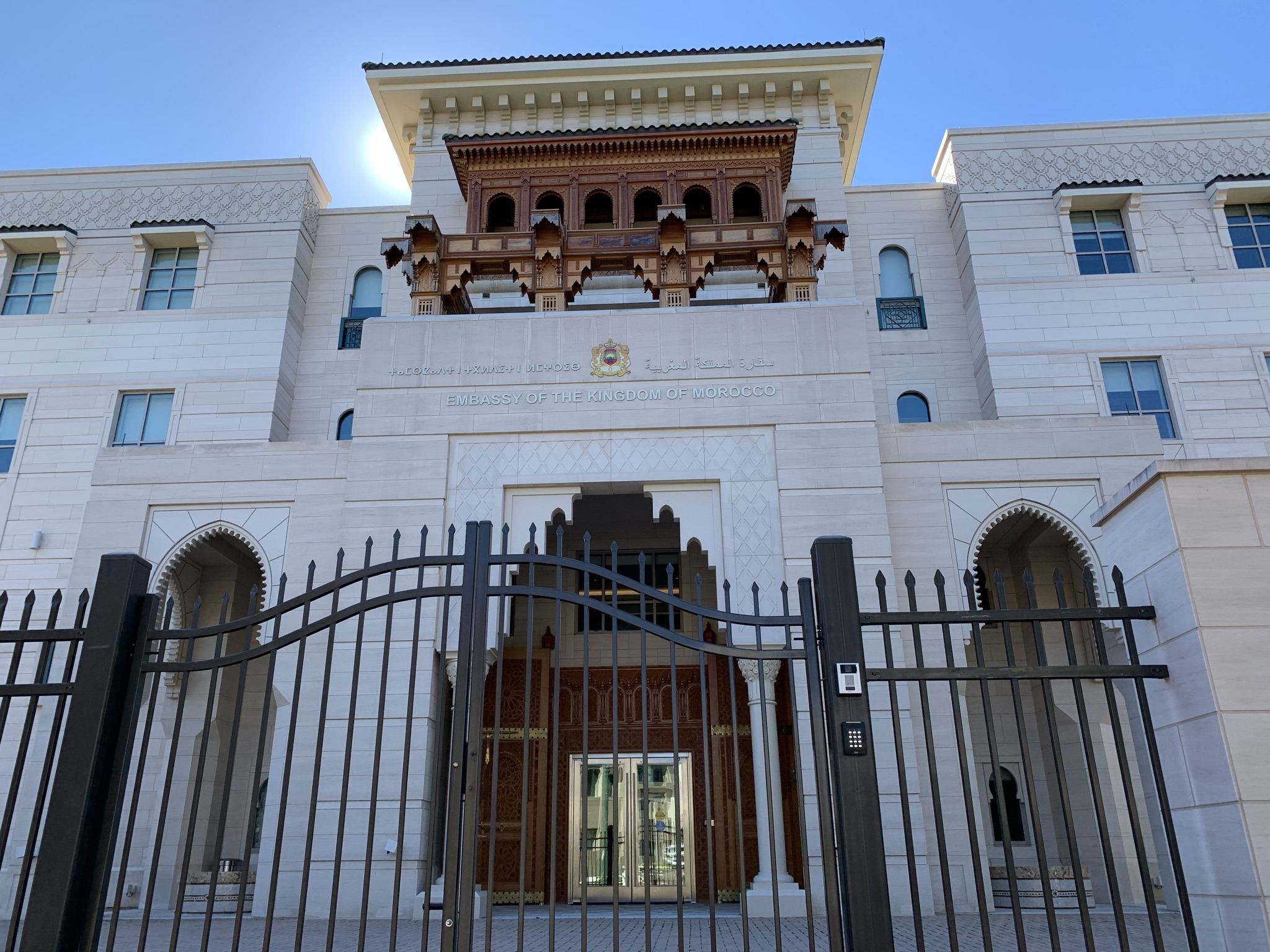
Embassy in Washington, D.C.

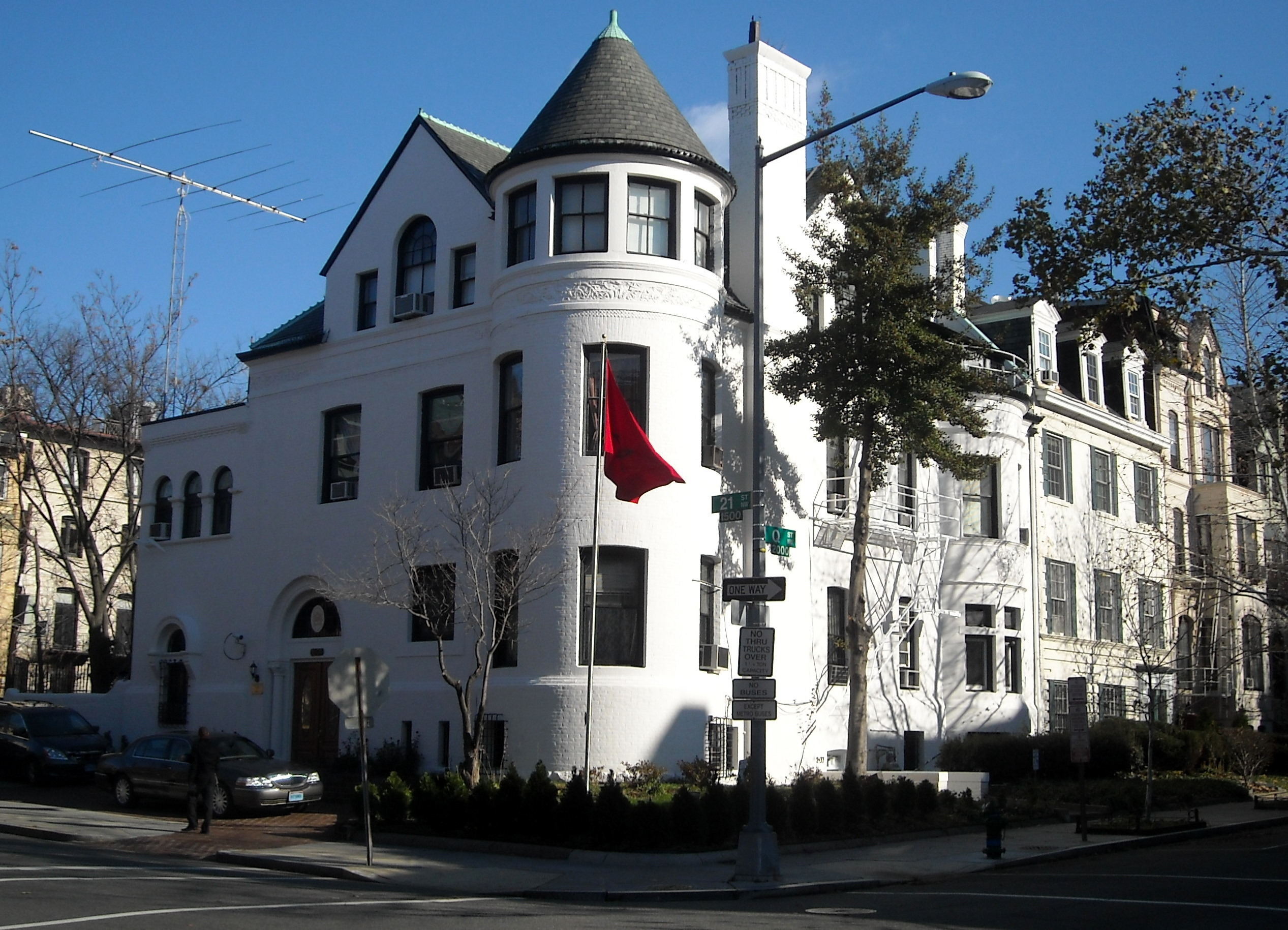
Embassy in Washington, D.C. (Consular section)

== Closed missions ==
=== Africa ===
Host country	Host city	Mission	Year closed	Ref.
Algeria	Algiers	Embassy	2021	
Liberia	Monrovia	Embassy	Unknown	

=== Americas ===
Host country	Host city	Mission	Year closed	Ref.
Venezuela	Caracas	Embassy	2009	

=== Asia ===
Host country	Host city	Mission	Year closed	Ref.
Iran	Tehran	Embassy	2018	

=== Europe ===
Host country	Host city	Mission	Year closed	Ref.
Spain	Málaga	Consulate	1995	

== See also ==
- Foreign relations of Morocco
- List of diplomatic missions in Morocco
- Visa policy of Morocco
