= Visa requirements for Moroccan citizens =

Administrative entry restrictions

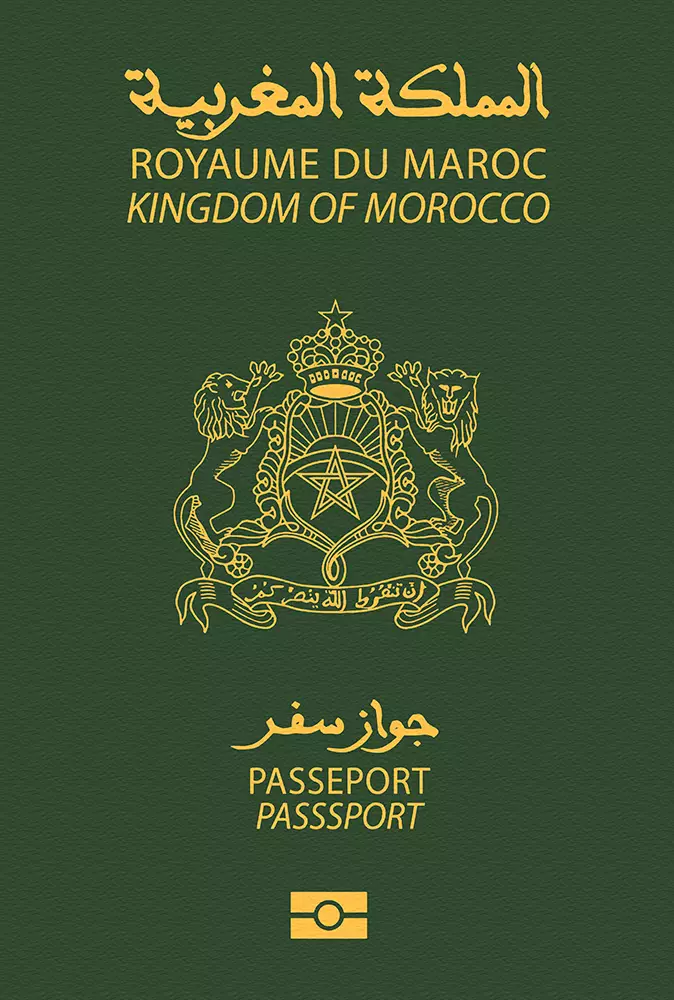
Moroccan Passport Cover

Visa requirements for Moroccan citizens are administrative entry restrictions imposed by other countries’ authorities on holders of Moroccan passports.

As of 2026, Moroccan citizens have visa-free or visa-on-arrival access to 70 countries and territories, ranking the Moroccan passport 62nd in the world according to the Henley Passport Index.

== Visa requirements map ==
Visa requirements for Moroccan citizens holding ordinary passports Morocco Part of Western Sahara Visa not required Visa not required (conditional) eVisa Visa available both on arrival or online Visa required

== Visa requirements ==
Country	Visa requirement	Allowed stay	Notes (excluding departure fees)
Afghanistan	eVisa		e-Visa holders must arrive via Kabul International (KBL).
Albania	eVisa	90 days	Visa-free for a maximum stay of 90 days within 180 days for valid visa holders of the Schengen Area member states, the United Kingdom and the United States.
Algeria	Visa required		Visitors on tours organized to some southern regions by an approved travel agency may obtain a visa on arrival for up to 30 days.
Andorra	Visa not required		Andorra can only be reached through Spain or France, so you must enter the Schengen area first and the usual Schengen visa rules apply.; Andorra is not part of Schengen, so you need a multiple-entry visa to return through Spain or France after your visit.
Angola	Visa not required	30 days	
Antigua and Barbuda	eVisa		Visa on arrival for a maximum stay of 30 days for valid visa holders or residents of the Schengen Area member states, the United Kingdom, the United States and Canada.
Argentina	Visa required		Moroccan passport holders are exempt from paying fees when applying for a visa.
Armenia	eVisa	120 days	Visa on arrival for a maximum stay of 120 days for valid visa holders or holding residence permit of the EU or Schengen Area member states, Australia, Canada, the United Kingdom, Ireland, Japan, South Korea, Russia and the United States or holding residence permit of the GCC member states.
Australia	Online visa required		May apply online. (Online Visitor e600 visa).
Austria	Visa required		Austria is part of the Schengen Area, so a Schengen visa issued by any other Schengen country is valid for entry. [Schengen Countries]
Azerbaijan	Visa not required	90 days	
Bahamas	eVisa	3 months	Visa not required for permanent residents of the United States or Canada.; Cruise ship passengers travelling to and returning from the Bahamas do not require to obtain visa for entry. Both entry and departure must be by a cruise ship.
Bahrain	eVisa / Visa on arrival	14 days	
Bangladesh	Visa required		Visa on arrival for a maximum stay of 30 days when traveling for tourism purposes and residing in a country without diplomatic or consular representation of Bangladesh provided that they hold a return or onward ticket and a confirmed hotel reservation.
Barbados	Visa not required	90 days	
Belarus	Visa required		Visa-free for holders of a valid visa issued by Russia.; Visa on arrival at Minsk National Airport (MSQ) for passengers with an original invitation letter from a Belarusian tourist company or medical/health organization, a service contract issued under Belarusian law, or supporting documents previously submitted to the Consular Division at Minsk National Airport (MSQ) at least 3–5 working days before departure.
Belgium	Visa required		Belgium is part of the Schengen Area, so a Schengen visa issued by any other Schengen country is valid for entry. [Schengen Countries]
Belize	Visa not required	30 days	
Benin	Visa not required	90 days	
Bhutan	eVisa	90 days	The Sustainable Development Fee (SDF) of 200 USD per person, per night for almost all visitors to Bhutan. Additionally, if payment is made in US dollars from September 1, 2023 to August 31, 2027, the SDF is 100 USD.
Bolivia	Online Visa	30 days	
Bosnia and Herzegovina	Visa required		Visa-free for a maximum stay of 30 days for valid visa holders (or holding residence permit) of the Schengen Area member states, Cyprus, the United Kingdom, Ireland, and the United States.
Botswana	eVisa	3 months	
Brazil	Visa not required	90 days	
Brunei	Visa required		72 hours visa-free transit if holding a confirmed onward ticket for a flight to a third country.
Bulgaria	Visa required		Bulgaria is part of the Schengen Area, so a Schengen visa issued by any other Schengen country is valid for entry. [Schengen Countries]
Burkina Faso	Visa not required	90 days	
Burundi	Online Visa / Visa on arrival	1 month	
Cambodia	eVisa / Visa on arrival	30 days	
Cameroon	eVisa		
Canada	Visa required		Eligible travelers who held a Canadian visa in the past 10 years or who hold a valid United States nonimmigrant visa can enter visa-free by air with an eTA.; A visa is still required for entry by land or sea.
Cape Verde	EASE	90 days	
Central African Republic	Visa required		
Chad	eVisa		Visa-free from 1 January 2027.
Chile	Visa required		Moroccan passport holders are exempt from paying fees when applying for a visa.
China	Visa required		Moroccan passport holders are exempt from paying fees when applying for a visa.; 24 hours visa-free transit through China (unless arriving in Fuzhou, Huangshan, Mudanjiang, Shenzhen or Yanji).; Hong Kong, Macau, and Taiwan count as third countries under the 24-hour transit without visa (TWOV) policies.
Colombia	Visa not required	90 days	
Comoros	Visa on arrival	45 days	
Republic of the Congo	Visa on arrival	30 days	Visa-free from 1 January 2027.
Democratic Republic of the Congo	eVisa	7 days	
Costa Rica	Visa required		Visa-free for a maximum stay of 90 days for valid multiple-entry visa holders of Canada and the United States.
Côte d'Ivoire	Visa not required	3 months	
Croatia	Visa required		Croatia is part of the Schengen Area, so a Schengen visa issued by any other Schengen country is valid for entry. [Schengen Countries]
Cuba	eVisa	90 days	Can be extended up to 90 days with a fee.
Cyprus	Visa required		Visa-free for a maximum stay of 90 days within 180 days for valid visa holders or residents of the Schengen Area member states.
Czech Republic	Visa required		The Czech Republic is part of the Schengen Area, so a Schengen visa issued by any other Schengen country is valid for entry. [Schengen Countries]
Denmark	Visa required		Denmark is part of the Schengen Area, so a Schengen visa issued by any other Schengen country is valid for entry. [Schengen Countries]
Djibouti	eVisa	90 days	
Dominica	Visa not required	21 days	Visa-free for a maximum stay of 6 months for valid visa holders or residents of the Schengen Area member states, the United Kingdom, the United States and Canada.
Dominican Republic	Visa not required	60 days	
Ecuador	Visa not required	90 days	
Egypt	Visa required		Visa on arrival for a maximum stay of 30 days for valid visa holders or residents of the Schengen Area member states, Australia, Canada, Japan, New Zealand, the United Kingdom or the United States.
El Salvador	Visa required		Visa-free for a maximum stay of 90 days for valid visa holders or residents of the Schengen Area member states, Canada and the United States.
Equatorial Guinea	eVisa		
Eritrea	Visa required		
Estonia	Visa required		Estonia is part of the Schengen Area, so a Schengen visa issued by any other Schengen country is valid for entry. [Schengen Countries]
Eswatini	Visa required		
Ethiopia	eVisa / Visa on arrival	90 days	Visa on arrival is obtainable only at Addis Ababa Bole International Airport.; e-Visa holders must arrive via Addis Ababa Bole International Airport.; e-Visa is available for 30 or 90 days.
Fiji	Online Visa		
Finland	Visa required		Finland is part of the Schengen Area, so a Schengen visa issued by any other Schengen country is valid for entry. [Schengen Countries]
France	Visa required		France is part of the Schengen Area, so a Schengen visa issued by any other Schengen country is valid for entry. [Schengen Countries]
Gabon	Visa not required	90 days	
Gambia	Visa not required	90 days	
Georgia	Visa required		Visa-free for a maximum stay of 90 days within 180 days for valid visa holders or residents of the Schengen Area member states, the United Kingdom, Ireland, the Gulf Cooperation Council, Australia, Canada, Israel, Japan, New Zealand, South Korea and the United States.
Germany	Visa required		Germany is part of the Schengen Area, so a Schengen visa issued by any other Schengen country is valid for entry. [Schengen Countries]
Ghana	Visa not required	90 days	Moroccan passport holders must obtain an Electronic Travel Authorization (ETA) prior to travel.
Greece	Visa required		Greece is part of the Schengen Area, so a Schengen visa issued by any other Schengen country is valid for entry. [Schengen Countries]
Grenada	Visa not required	90 days	
Guatemala	Visa required		Visa-free for a maximum stay of 90 days for valid visa holders or residents of the Schengen Area member states, the United States and Canada.
Guinea	Visa not required	90 days	
Guinea-Bissau	Visa on arrival	90 days	
Guyana	eVisa		
Haiti	Visa not required	90 days	
Honduras	Visa required		Visa-free for a maximum stay of 90 days for valid visa holders or residents of the Schengen Area member states, the United States and Canada.
Hungary	Visa required		Hungary is part of the Schengen Area, so a Schengen visa issued by any other Schengen country is valid for entry. [Schengen Countries]
Iceland	Visa required		Iceland is part of the Schengen Area, so a Schengen visa issued by any other Schengen country is valid for entry. [Schengen Countries]
India	eVisa	30 days	
Indonesia	e-VOA / Visa on arrival	30 days	
Iran	eVisa	30 days	
Iraq	eVisa	30 days	
Ireland	Visa required		Moroccan passport holders are exempt from paying fees when applying for a visa.
Israel	eVisa		
Italy	Visa required		Italy is part of the Schengen Area, so a Schengen visa issued by any other Schengen country is valid for entry. [Schengen Countries]
Jamaica	Visa required		
Japan	Visa required		Moroccan passport holders with residence in Australia, Brazil, Cambodia, Canada, Saudi Arabia, South Africa, Taiwan, the United Kingdom and the United States can apply for a single entry e-Visa for tourism purposes only.
Jordan	eVisa / Visa on arrival		Visa can be obtained upon arrival obtainable at most international ports of entry and land border crossings. (except King Hussein/Allenby Bridge)
Kazakhstan	Visa not required	30 days	
Kenya	Visa not required	60 days	
Kiribati	Visa not required	90 days	90 days within any 12-month period.
North Korea	Visa required		
South Korea	Electronic Travel Authorization	90 days	The validity period of a K-ETA is 3 years from the date of approval.
Kuwait	Visa required		
Kyrgyzstan	eVisa	60 days	e-Visa holders must arrive via Manas International Airport or Osh Airport or through land crossings with China (at Irkeshtam and Torugart), Kazakhstan (at Ak-jol, Ak-Tilek, Chaldybar, Chon-Kapka), Tajikistan (at Bor-Dobo, Kulundu, Kyzyl-Bel) and Uzbekistan (at Dostuk).
Laos	eVisa / Visa on arrival	30 days	18 (Note: Savannakhet Airport; Lanetoui - Mengkang (China); Meuangmom - Wan Pong (Myanmar); Banvang - Ban Khok Phai (Thailand); Namngeun - Huay Kon (Thailand); Paksan - Bueng Kan (Thailand); Paktaphan - Pak Saeng (Thailand); Pangmon - Ban Huak (Thailand); Phoudou (Thailand); Dak ta ock - Nam Giang (Vietnam); La Lai (Vietnam); Namkan (Vietnam); Namphao - Cau Treo (Vietnam); Namsoy - Na Meo (Vietnam); Naphao - Cha Lo (Vietnam); Pahang - Long Sap (Vietnam); Panghok - Tây Trang (Vietnam); Phoukeua - Bo Y (Vietnam)) of the 33 border crossings are only open to regular visa holders.; e-Visa may be used to enter Laos through the Luang Prabang, Pakse and Vientiane international airports, 3 Thai-Lao Friendship Bridges (Note: Vientiane (Friendship Bridge 1); Savannakhet (Friendship Bridge 2); Bokeo (Friendship Bridge 4)), in Boten (road and railroad), and in Vientiane (at Khamsavath railway station).; Visa on arrival is available at the Luang Prabang, Pakse and Vientiane international airports, 4 Thai-Lao Friendship Bridges (Note: Vientiane (Friendship Bridge 1); Savannakhet (Friendship Bridge 2); Khammouane (Friendship Bridge 3); Bokeo (Friendship Bridge 4)) and 7 border crossings. (Note: Nongnokkheane - Trapeang Kriel (Cambodia); Boten - Bo han (China); Golden Triangle/Samliemkham (Thailand); Khamsavath railway station (Thailand); Namheuang - Ban Na Kraseng (Thailand); Vang tao - Chongmek (Thailand); Dansavan - Lao Bảo (Vietnam))
Latvia	Visa required		Latvia is part of the Schengen Area, so a Schengen visa issued by any other Schengen country is valid for entry. [Schengen Countries]
Lebanon	Visa on arrival (conditional)	30 days	Visa on arrival at Beirut International Airport or any other port of entry only if they are holding a copy of a reservation in a 3 to 5 star hotel or private residential address with telephone number in the Republic of Lebanon, at least 2,000 USD in cash, a non-refundable return or circle trip ticket, and there are no Israeli stamps, visas, or seals on their passport.
Lesotho	Visa required		
Liberia	Visa required		
Libya	eVisa		
Liechtenstein	Visa required		Liechtenstein is part of the Schengen Area, so a Schengen visa issued by any other Schengen country is valid for entry. [Schengen Countries]
Lithuania	Visa required		Lithuania is part of the Schengen Area, so a Schengen visa issued by any other Schengen country is valid for entry. [Schengen Countries]
Luxembourg	Visa required		Luxembourg is part of the Schengen Area, so a Schengen visa issued by any other Schengen country is valid for entry. [Schengen Countries]
Madagascar	eVisa / Visa on arrival	90 days	For stays of 61 to 90 days, the visa fee is 59 USD.
Malawi	eVisa	90 days	
Malaysia	Visa not required	90 days	
Maldives	Visa not required	30 days	
Mali	Visa not required	90 days	May enter with an Identity Card or an expired passport.
Malta	Visa required		Malta is part of the Schengen Area, so a Schengen visa issued by any other Schengen country is valid for entry. [Schengen Countries]
Marshall Islands	Visa on arrival	90 days	
Mauritania	eVisa	30 days	
Mauritius	Visa on arrival	60 days	
Mexico	Visa required		Visa-free for a maximum stay of 180 days for valid visa holders or residents of the Schengen Area member states, the United Kingdom, the United States, Canada and Japan.
Micronesia	Visa not required	30 days	
Moldova	Visa required		Holders of a valid residence permit or a valid visa (excluding transit visas) issued by a Member State of the European Union, a State party to the Schengen Agreement, the United Kingdom, the United States of America, or Canada are exempt from the invitation letter requirement.
Monaco	Visa required		
Mongolia	Visa required		
Montenegro	Visa required		Visa-free for a maximum stay of 30 days for valid visa holders or residents of the Schengen Area member states, the United Kingdom, Ireland and the United States.
Mozambique	eVisa / Visa on arrival	30 days	
Myanmar	eVisa	28 days	e-Visa holders must arrive via Yangon, Nay Pyi Taw or Mandalay airports or via land border crossings with Thailand — Tachileik, Myawaddy and Kawthaung or India — Rih Khaw Dar and Tamu.; e-Visa for tourism only.
Namibia	eVisa	3 months	
Nauru	Visa required		
Nepal	Online Visa / Visa on arrival	90 days	
Netherlands	Visa required		Netherlands is part of the Schengen Area, so a Schengen visa issued by any other Schengen country is valid for entry. [Schengen Countries]
New Zealand	Visa required		Holders of an Australian Permanent Resident Visa or Resident Return Visa may be granted a New Zealand Resident Visa on arrival permitting indefinite stay (pursuant to the Trans-Tasman Travel Arrangement), subject to meeting character requirements and obtaining an Electronic Travel Authority prior to departure.
Nicaragua	eVisa		
Niger	Visa not required	90 days	
Nigeria	eVisa	30 days	
North Macedonia	Visa required		Visa-free for a maximum stay of 15 days for valid visa holders of the Schengen Area member states.
Norway	Visa required		Norway is part of the Schengen Area, so a Schengen visa issued by any other Schengen country is valid for entry. [Schengen Countries]
Oman	Visa required		Visa-free for a maximum stay of 14 days for valid visa holders of Australia, Canada, Japan, the United States, United Kingdom or the Schengen Area member states.
Pakistan	eVisa	3 months	
Palau	Free visa on arrival	30 days	
Panama	Visa required		Visa-free for a maximum stay of 30 days for valid visa holders or residents of Australia, the United Kingdom, the United States and Canada.
Papua New Guinea	eVisa	60 days	Visitors may apply for a visa online under the "Tourist - Own Itinerary" category.
Paraguay	Visa required		
Peru	Visa required		Visa-free for a maximum stay of 183 days within a one-year period for valid visa holders of the Schengen Area member states and the United States.
Philippines	Visa not required	30 days	
Poland	Visa required		Poland is part of the Schengen Area, so a Schengen visa issued by any other Schengen country is valid for entry. [Schengen Countries]
Portugal	Visa required		Portugal is part of the Schengen Area, so a Schengen visa issued by any other Schengen country is valid for entry. [Schengen Countries]
Qatar	eVisa		Travelers can apply for a visa on the Hayya website.
Romania	Visa required		Romania is part of the Schengen Area, so a Schengen visa issued by any other Schengen country is valid for entry. [Schengen Countries]
Russia	Visa required		Visa-free for holders of a valid visa issued by Belarus.
Rwanda	Visa not required	30 days	
Saint Kitts and Nevis	eVisa	30 days	
Saint Lucia	Visa required		
Saint Vincent and the Grenadines	Visa not required	30 days	
Samoa	Entry permit on arrival	90 days	
San Marino	Visa not required	90 days	
São Tomé and Príncipe	Visa not required	15 days	
Saudi Arabia	Visa required		Tourists eligible for Visa on Arrival must hold valid tourist or business visas from the US, United Kingdom, or Schengen countries. The visa should have been used once with an entry stamp. Permanent residents of the US, UK, or EU, along with their first-degree relatives, can also apply after confirming their presence.
Senegal	Visa not required	90 days	
Serbia	eVisa	90 days	90 days within any 180-day period. Transfers allowed.; Visa-free for a maximum stay of 90 days within 180 days for valid visa holders or residents of the Schengen Area member states, the United Kingdom, Ireland and the United States.
Seychelles	Electronic Border System	3 months	Application can be submitted up to 30 days before travel.; Visitors must upload a reservation confirmation(s) for each visitor's location of stay in Seychelles.; Yellow fever vaccination certificate is required if coming from endemic countries.; Payment of the fee (EUR 10) by credit or debit card.; Valid for one journey only and it expires once exit the country.
Sierra Leone	eVisa / Visa on arrival	3 months / 30 days	
Singapore	eVisa		
Slovakia	Visa required		Slovakia is part of the Schengen Area, so a Schengen visa issued by any other Schengen country is valid for entry. [Schengen Countries]
Slovenia	Visa required		Slovenia is part of the Schengen Area, so a Schengen visa issued by any other Schengen country is valid for entry. [Schengen Countries]
Solomon Islands	eVisa	30 days	
Somalia	eVisa	30 days	
South Africa	eVisa		
South Sudan	eVisa		
Spain	Visa required		Spain is part of the Schengen Area, so a Schengen visa issued by any other Schengen country is valid for entry. [Schengen Countries]; Residents of Tetouan may enter Ceuta without a visa.; Residents of Nador may enter Melilla without a visa.
Sri Lanka	ETA / Visa on arrival	30 days	Sri Lanka introduced an ETA valid for 30 days.
Sudan	Visa required		
Suriname	Visa not required	90 days	An entrance fee of USD 50 or EUR 50 must be paid online prior to arrival.; Multiple entry e-Visa is also available.
Sweden	Visa required		Sweden is part of the Schengen Area, so a Schengen visa issued by any other Schengen country is valid for entry. [Schengen Countries]
Switzerland	Visa required		Switzerland is part of the Schengen Area, so a Schengen visa issued by any other Schengen country is valid for entry. [Schengen Countries]
Syria	Visa not required		
Tajikistan	Visa not required (conditional) / eVisa	14 days / 60 days	Holders of passports which are 55 years old and more do not require a visa for 14 days.
Tanzania	eVisa / Visa on arrival	90 days	e-Visa : Single Entry for 50 USD.
Thailand	eVisa	60 days	
Timor-Leste	Visa on arrival	30 days	
Togo	Visa not required	90 days	Travelers must complete an online travel declaration at least 24 hours before arrival.
Tonga	Visa required		
Trinidad and Tobago	eVisa	90 days	
Tunisia	Visa not required	90 days	
Turkey	Visa not required	90 days	
Turkmenistan	Visa required		When transiting between two non-bordering countries, visitors can obtain a Turkmenistan transit visa for a five-day stay. This must be applied for in advance at the Turkmenistan Embassy. Visitors must also submit copies of the visas for the country of entry into Turkmenistan and the country of departure from Turkmenistan. Visa fee is 20 USD.
Tuvalu	Visa on arrival	1 month	
Uganda	eVisa	3 months	
Ukraine	Visa required		
United Arab Emirates	Online Visa required		May apply using 'Smart service'.
United Kingdom and Crown dependencies	Visa required		Conditional 48 hours visa-free transit at the international airports if holding a confirmed onward ticket for a flight to a third country.
United States	Visa required		B1/B2 visas issued with validity of 10 years.
Uruguay	Visa required		
Uzbekistan	eVisa	30 days	5-day visa-free transit at the international airports if holding a confirmed onward ticket for a flight to a third country.
Vanuatu	Visa not required	120 days	
Vatican City	Visa required		
Venezuela	eVisa		
Vietnam	eVisa		e-Visa is valid for 90 days and multiple entry.
Yemen	Visa required		Yemen introduced an e-Visa system for visitors who meet certain eligibility requirements (group travel of 10 or more people, business trips, and transit etc.).
Zambia	Visa not required	90 days	
Zimbabwe	eVisa	1 month	

== Dependent, Disputed, or Restricted territories ==
Unrecognized or partially recognized countries

Territory	Conditions of access	Notes
Abkhazia	Visa required	Tourists from all countries (except Georgia) can visit Abkhazia for a period not exceeding 24 hours as part of an organized tourist group.
Kosovo	Visa required	Visa-free for a maximum stay of 90 days within 180 days for valid visa holders of the Schengen Area member states.
Northern Cyprus	Visa not required	
Palestine	Visa not required	Arrival by sea to the Gaza Strip not allowed.
Somaliland	Visa on arrival	30 days for 30 USD, payable on arrival.
South Ossetia	Visa required	To enter South Ossetia, visitors must have a multiple-entry visa for Russia and register their stay with the Migration Service of the Ministry of Internal Affairs within 3 days.
Taiwan	Visa required	
Transnistria	Visa not required	Registration required after 24h.

Dependent and autonomous territories

Territory	Conditions of access	Notes
China
Hong Kong	Visa not required	30 days
Macau	Visa not required	90 days
Denmark
Faroe Islands	Visa required	
Greenland	Visa required	
France
French Guiana	Visa required	
French Polynesia	Visa required	
(France) French West Indies	Visa required	Includes overseas departments of Guadeloupe and Martinique and overseas collectivities of Saint Barthélemy and Saint Martin.
Mayotte	Visa required	
New Caledonia	Visa required	
Réunion	Visa required	
Saint Pierre and Miquelon	Visa required	
Wallis and Futuna	Visa required	
Netherlands
Aruba	Visa required	Holders of a visa issued by the Schengen member states, the United Kingdom or Ireland are granted a max. stay of 90 days within 1 calendar year.; Holders of a cruise reservation confirmation do not require a visa for a maximum stay of 24 hours.
Caribbean Netherlands	Visa required	Includes Bonaire, Sint Eustatius and Saba.; Holders of a visa issued by the Schengen member states, the United Kingdom or Ireland are granted a max. stay of 90 days within 1 calendar year.; Holders of a cruise reservation confirmation do not require a visa for a maximum stay of 48 hours.
Curaçao	Visa required	Holders of a visa issued by the Schengen member states, the United Kingdom or Ireland are granted a max. stay of 90 days within 1 calendar year.; Holders of a cruise reservation confirmation do not require a visa for a maximum stay of 48 hours.
Sint Maarten	Visa required	Holders of a visa issued by the Schengen member states, the United Kingdom, Ireland, the United States or Canada are granted a max. stay of 90 days within 1 calendar year.; Passengers transiting overland to the French part of St. Martin do not require a visa for a maximum stay of 48 hours.; Holders of a cruise reservation confirmation do not require a visa for a maximum stay of 48 hours.
New Zealand
Cook Islands	Visa not required	31 days
Niue	Visa not required	30 days
Tokelau	Visa required	To visit Tokelau, you must obtain a permit issued by the Tokelau Apia Liaison Office in Apia, Samoa. This permit is mandatory for all visitors, regardless of their New Zealand visa status. Additionally, all travel to Tokelau is by boat from Samoa, and a permit from the Samoan Immigration Authorities is required to leave and re-enter Samoa.
United Kingdom
Akrotiri and Dhekelia	Visa required	A Schengen visa is required to enter Akrotiri and Dhekelia, as the territory is located in Cyprus and follows Cypriot visa policy.
Anguilla	eVisa	Holders of a visa issued by the United Kingdom, the United States or Canada do not require a visa for a maximum stay of 3 months.
Bermuda	Visa not required	3 months
British Indian Ocean Territory	Special permit required	Special permit required.
British Virgin Islands	Visa required	Holders of a visa issued by the United Kingdom, the United States or Canada do not require a visa for a maximum stay of 6 months.
Cayman Islands	Visa required	Holders of a cruise reservation confirmation do not require a visa for a maximum stay of 24 hours.
Falkland Islands	Visa required	
Gibraltar	Visa required	A Schengen visa is required to enter Gibraltar, as the territory follows the Schengen visa policy and has open borders with Spain.
Montserrat	eVisa	
Pitcairn Islands	Visa not required	14 days visa-free and landing fee 35 USD or tax of 5 USD if not going ashore.
Ascension Island	eVisa	3 months within any 1 year-period.
Saint Helena	eVisa	
Tristan da Cunha	Permission required	Permission to land required for 15/30 pounds sterling (yacht/ship passenger) for Tristan da Cunha Island or 20 pounds sterling for Gough Island, Inaccessible Island or Nightingale Islands.
South Georgia and the South Sandwich Islands	Permit required	Pre-arrival permit from the Commissioner required (72 hours/1 month for 110/160 pounds sterling).
Turks and Caicos Islands	Visa required	Holders of a valid visa issued by Canada, United Kingdom or the US do not require a visa for a maximum stay of 90 days.
United States
American Samoa	Entry permit required	A visa issued by the United States is not valid for entry into American Samoa.; Visitors must apply for an entry permit through the Department of Legal Affairs in American Samoa.
Guam	Visa required	
Northern Mariana Islands	Visa required	
Puerto Rico	Visa required	
U.S. Virgin Islands	Visa required	
Antarctica and adjacent islands
Special permits required for Bouvet Island, British Antarctic Territory, French Southern and Antarctic Lands, Argentine Antarctica, (Australia) Australian Antarctic Territory, (Antártica Chilena Province) Chilean Antarctic Territory, (Australia) Heard Island and McDonald Islands, (Norway) Peter I Island, (Norway) Queen Maud Land, (New Zealand) Ross Dependency.

== See also ==
- Visa policy of Morocco
- Moroccan passport
