= Visa policy of Morocco =

Policy on permits required to enter Morocco

Visitors to Morocco must obtain a visa unless they are citizens from one of the visa-exempt countries, or citizens who may obtain an Electronic Travel Authorisation (AEVM), or citizens eligible for an e-Visa.

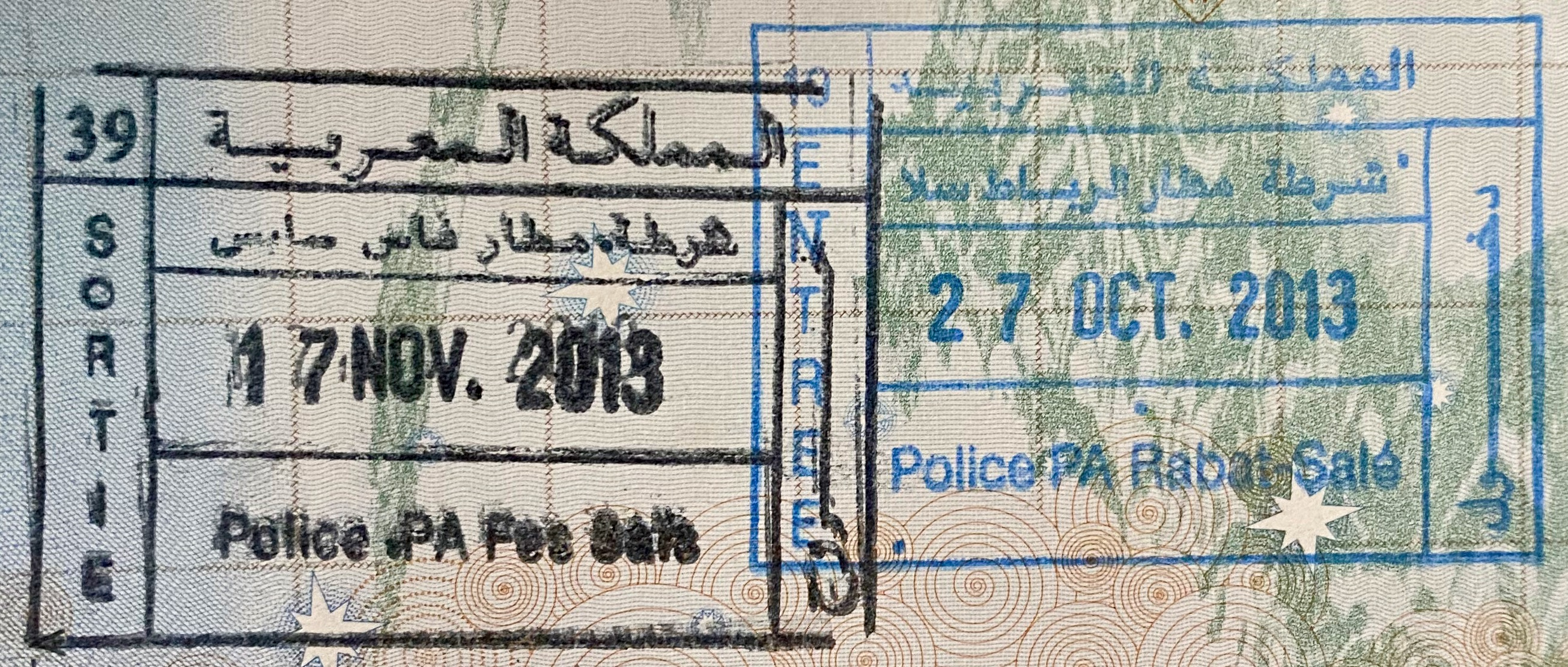
Entry and exit stamps

On July 10, 2022, the Moroccan government launched an e-Visa system to facilitate the granting of visas to foreign citizens subject to this formality.

== Visa policy map ==
Visa policy of Morocco Morocco Part of Western Sahara Visa not required (90 days) Visa not required (60 days) Visa not required (30 days) Electronic Travel Authorisation (AEVM) eVisa eVisa (conditional) / Visa required Visa required

== Visa exemption ==
Citizens of the following countries and territories may enter Morocco without a visa for the following period:

90 days

- All European Union member states
- All European Free Trade Association member states
- (Cooperation Council for the Arab States of the Gulf) All Gulf Cooperation Council member states

- Albania
- Algeria (Note: Citizens of Algeria, as well as individuals of Algerian descent (including those holding dual or other foreign citizenship), are subject to enhanced screening measures upon arrival and may be denied entry.)
- Andorra
- Argentina
- Australia
- Azerbaijan
- Brazil
- Burkina Faso
- Canada
- Cape Verde
- Chile
- China (Note: For Chinese citizens with People's Republic of China passports, Hong Kong Special Administrative Region passports or Macau Special Administrative Region passports only.)
- Colombia
- Gabon
- Indonesia
- Japan
- Macau
- Malaysia
- Mali
- Mexico
- Monaco
- New Zealand
- Niger
- Peru
- Philippines
- Russia
- San Marino
- Senegal
- Singapore
- South Korea
- Togo
- Tunisia
- Turkey
- United Kingdom (Note: For British Citizens only.)
- United States

60 days

- Dominican Republic

30 days

- Hong Kong
- Maldives

30 days within any 180 days

- Kazakhstan

=== Electronic Travel Authorisation (AEVM) ===
Citizens of countries exempt from visa requirements must obtain an Electronic Travel Authorisation (AEVM). In the future, AEVM will apply to all visa-exempt countries, except for nationals with a valid Moroccan residence permit, transit passengers and spouses of Moroccan citizens. Those married to Moroccan nationals must provide supporting documents upon arrival.

Citizens of the following countries do not require a visa but must obtain an AEVM in advance to enter Morocco.

- Congo
- Ecuador
- Ghana
- Guinea

Date of visa changes
- 19 March 1956: Argentina, Bolivia, Canada, Chile, Colombia, Costa Rica, Cuba, Dominican Republic, Ecuador, El Salvador, Guatemala, Haiti, Honduras, Mexico, Nicaragua, Panama, Paraguay, Peru, United States, Uruguay, Venezuela (unilateral)
- 25 August 1957: France
- 25 September 1957: United States (formalized)
- 3 May 1958: Portugal
- 1 October 1958: Canada (formalized)
- 1 November 1958: United Kingdom
- 1 June 1960: Iceland, Norway, Sweden
- 1 July 1960: Indonesia
- 1 January 1961: Japan
- 1 June 1961: Finland
- 9 September 1961: Argentina (formalized)
- 1 February 1962: Denmark
- 15 March 1963: Algeria, Libya
- 17 September 1963: Mali
- 1 January 1964: Austria, Switzerland
- 3 June 1964: Spain
- 1 July 1964: Luxembourg
- 17 August 1964: Belgium
- 9 December 1964: Tunisia
- 1 January 1965: Greece
- 1 June 1965: Italy, Yugoslavia
- 11 December 1965: Senegal
- 1 February 1966: Ireland
- 1 January 1967: Venezuela (formalized)
- 7 November 1967: Niger
- 15 January 1969: Germany
- 5 May 1969: Mexico (formalized)
- 13 September 1969: Netherlands
- 24 June 1970: Brazil
- 14 February 1977: Saudi Arabia
- 21 April 1982: United Arab Emirates
- 10 May 1985: Kuwait, Qatar
- 22 February 1987: Bahrain
- 21 July 1988: Yugoslavia (resumed)
- 21 April 1989: Turkey
- 15 May 1989: Oman
- 30 October 1991: Andorra, Australia, Hong Kong (British-issued passports), Liechtenstein, Monaco, New Zealand, San Marino
- 1 September 1993: South Korea
- 1 July 1996: Singapore
- 14 October 1997: Guinea
- 1 October 1999: Ivory Coast
- 1 October 2002: Hong Kong (SAR passport)
- 1 May 2004: Cyprus, Czech Republic, Estonia, Hungary, Latvia, Lithuania, Malta, Poland, Slovakia, Slovenia
- 30 July 2004: Algeria (resumed)
- 10 October 2004: Philippines
- 25 March 2005: Republic of the Congo
- 13 June 2005: Russia
- 1 January 2007: Bulgaria, Romania
- 1 July 2013: Croatia
- 5 September 2013: Gabon
- 10 December 2015: Macau
- 1 June 2016: China
- 27 December 2017: Malaysia
- 13 March 2020: Maldives
- 28 January 2021: Burkina Faso
- 6 April 2021: Colombia (resumed)
- 14 July 2021: Dominican Republic (resumed)
- 9 September 2022: Togo
- 8 May 2024: Cape Verde
- 28 August 2024: Azerbaijan
- 19 March 2025: Kazakhstan
- 15 August 2026: Albania

AEVM

- 1 November 2018: Guinea, Mali, Republic of the Congo (AEVM introduced)
- 6 June 2025: Ghana (AEVM introduced)
- 1 August 2025: Ecuador (AEVM introduced)
- 25 September 2025: Algeria, Burkina Faso, Cape Verde, Gabon, Niger, Senegal, Togo, Tunisia (AEVM introduced)
- 25 January 2026: Algeria, Burkina Faso, Cape Verde, Gabon, Niger, Senegal, Togo, Tunisia (AEVM requirement waived)
- 27 April 2026: Mali (AEVM requirement waived)

Cancelled:

- 24 June 1970: Cuba
- 22 September 1978: Bolivia, Colombia (was resumed in 2021), Costa Rica, Dominican Republic (was resumed in 2021), Ecuador (was resumed in 2025), El Salvador, Guatemala, Haiti, Honduras, Nicaragua, Panama, Paraguay, Uruguay
- 28 November 1984: Yugoslavia (was resumed in 1988 until 1993)
- 11 March 1993: Yugoslavia (current as Bosnia and Herzegovina, Montenegro, North Macedonia and Serbia)
- 26 August 1994: Algeria (was resumed in 2004)
- 7 February 2014: Libya
- 16 December 2019: Venezuela
- 1 September 2024: Ivory Coast

=== Non-ordinary passports ===
Holders of passports issued by the following countries are allowed to enter and remain in Morocco for a maximum period of 90 days.

- Albania^{D S Sp}
- Algeria^{D S Sp} (Note: Entry limited to official duty.)
- Andorra^{D S}
- Angola^{D}
- Argentina^{D S Sp}
- Austria^{D S}
- Azerbaijan^{D O S Sp}
- Bahrain^{D S Sp}
- Belgium^{D S Sp}
- Benin^{D S Sp}
- Bosnia and Herzegovina^{D S Sp}
- Brazil^{D S Sp}
- Brunei^{D O S Sp}
- Burkina Faso^{D S}
- Bulgaria^{D S}
- Cambodia^{D S}
- Cape Verde^{D O S}
- Chad^{D S Sp}
- Chile^{D O S}
- China^{D S}
- Colombia^{D O S Sp}
- Congo^{D S Sp}
- Costa Rica^{D S Sp}
- Côte d'Ivoire^{D S Sp}
- Croatia^{D S Sp}
- Cuba^{D S Sp}
- Cyprus^{D S Sp}
- Czech Republic^{D S Sp}
- Denmark^{D S}
- Dominican Republic^{D S Sp}
- Djibouti^{D S Sp}
- Egypt^{D S Sp}
- El Salvador^{D S Sp}
- Equatorial Guinea^{D S Sp O}
- Estonia^{D S Sp}
- Finland^{D}
- France^{D S}
- Gambia^{D O S Sp}
- Gabon^{D S Sp}
- Germany^{D}
- Ghana^{D S Sp}
- Greece^{D S Sp}
- Guatemala^{D O S}
- Guinea^{D S Sp}
- Guinea-Bissau^{D S Sp}
- Honduras^{D O Sp}
- Hong Kong^{D S Sp}
- Hungary^{D S Sp}
- India^{D O S}
- Indonesia^{D S}
- Israel^{D S}
- Italy^{D S Sp}
- Japan^{D S}
- Jordan^{D S Sp}
- Kazakhstan^{D S}
- Kuwait^{D O S}
- Kyrgyzstan^{D S}
- Laos^{D O S}
- Liberia^{D S Sp}
- Libya^{D S Sp}
- Liechtenstein^{D S Sp}
- Lithuania^{D S Sp}
- Luxembourg^{D S Sp}
- Macau^{D O S Sp}
- Malawi^{D S}
- Malaysia^{D S Sp}
- Maldives^{D S Sp}
- Mali^{D S Sp}
- Malta^{D S Sp}
- Mauritania^{D S Sp}
- Mexico^{D O S}
- Monaco^{D S}
- Montenegro^{D S Sp}
- Myanmar^{D O S Sp}
- Netherlands^{D S Sp}
- Niger^{D S Sp}
- Nigeria^{D O S}
- Norway^{D S Sp}
- Oman^{D S Sp}
- Pakistan^{D S Sp}
- Paraguay^{D S Sp}
- Peru^{D S Sp}
- Philippines^{D S Sp}
- Poland^{D S Sp}
- Portugal^{D S Sp}
- Qatar^{D S Sp}
- Romania^{D S}
- Russia^{D S Sp}
- Rwanda^{D S Sp}
- San Marino^{D S}
- São Tomé and Príncipe^{D S Sp}
- Senegal^{D S Sp}
- Serbia^{D S Sp}
- Sierra Leone^{D S Sp}
- Singapore^{D}
- Slovakia^{D S Sp}
- Slovenia^{D S Sp}
- Solomon Islands^{D O Sp}
- South Korea^{D S Sp}
- Spain^{D S}
- Sudan^{D S Sp}
- Suriname^{D S Sp}
- Sweden^{D}
- Switzerland^{D S Sp}
- Tajikistan^{D S}
- Thailand^{D S Sp O}
- Togo^{D S Sp}
- Tunisia^{D S Sp}
- Turkey^{D S Sp}
- Ukraine^{D S Sp}
- United Arab Emirates^{D S Sp}
- Uruguay^{D S Sp}
- Vietnam^{D S Sp}
- Yemen^{D S Sp}

_{D - Diplomatic passports}
_{O - Official passports}
_{S - Service passports}
_{Sp - Special passports}

A visa is unilaterally waived for holders of non-ordinary passports issued by countries whose ordinary passport holders are visa-exempt. This applies to holders of diplomatic, official, service and special passports of Australia, Canada, Iceland, Ireland, Latvia, New Zealand, Saudi Arabia, United Kingdom, United States.

A visa is not required for United Nations laissez-passer holders for up to 90 days.

=== Future changes ===
Morocco has signed visa exemption agreements with the following countries, but they have not yet entered into force:

Country	Passports	Agreement signed on
Kenya	Diplomatic, servive, official	April 2026
Comoros	Diplomatic, service	March 2026
Eswatini	Diplomatic, service	June 2025
Moldova	Diplomatic, service, special	April 2025
Iraq	Diplomatic	February 2025
Saint Lucia	Diplomatic	November 2024
Madagascar	Diplomatic, service	June 2024

== Electronic visa (e-Visa) ==
Citizens of the following countries holding ordinary passports may apply for an e-Visa without further document requirement:

- Benin
- Brunei Darussalam
- Cambodia
- Guatemala
- India
- Israel
- Jordan
- Laos
- Thailand
- Vietnam

=== Conditional e-Visa ===
Citizens of most other countries and regions that are not visa-exempt must apply for a visa in advance from one of the diplomatic missions of Morocco. However, these citizens may still apply for an e-Visa if they hold a valid visa or permanent residency document issued by one of the following countries:

- (European Union) Any Schengen Area member state

- Australia
- Canada
- Ireland
- Japan
- New Zealand
- United Arab Emirates (Note: For holders of a residence permit only.)
- United Kingdom
- United States

Only visas physically stamped in the passport or residence cards are recognized.

Citizens of the following countries and regions cannot apply for a regular and conditional e-Visa:

- Iran
- Kosovo
- Palestine
- Syria
- Taiwan
- Tuvalu

== Transit ==
Transit through Morocco is divided into two categories: airside transit and landside transit. Airside transit applies to passengers who remain within the international transit area of the airport without passing through Moroccan border control, while landside transit applies to passengers who must enter Morocco during transit, including for overnight connections, baggage collection, or airport changes.

=== Airside transit ===
- Available to passengers transiting through Mohammed V International Airport (CMN) to a third-country destination.
- Available only to passengers remaining within the international transit area of the airport.
- Passengers must hold confirmed onward tickets and valid travel documentation for their final destination.
- Transit without a visa (TWOV) is permitted for all nationalities provided the passenger remains in the international transit area and the onward flight departs within 24 hours.
- Passengers who need to collect and re-check baggage, leave the transit area, or otherwise pass through immigration control may require a transit visa or another appropriate entry visa depending on nationality.

=== Landside transit ===
- Applies to passengers who pass through Moroccan immigration control during transit.
- Required for passengers leaving the airport transit area, changing airports, collecting and re-checking baggage, or staying overnight during a connection.
- Passengers transiting with Royal Air Maroc on layovers between 8 and 24 hours may be granted a temporary administrative entry permit to access airline-provided accommodation outside the airport (except citizens of Nigeria, who require a valid Moroccan entry visa to leave the international transit zone).
- In most cases, passengers with layovers exceeding 24 hours must obtain a transit visa or another appropriate entry visa if they are not otherwise visa-exempt.
- Travelers wishing to leave the airport during a long layover to visit Morocco must obtain a valid Moroccan entry visa or e-Visa if required by nationality.

=== Types of transit visas ===
- Airport transit visa: Moroccan law provides for an airport transit visa for certain nationalities transiting through Moroccan airports while remaining in the international transit area. In practice, passengers of all nationalities may transit airside without a visa for up to 24 hours, provided they do not leave the international transit area.
- Transit visa: Issued to travelers transiting through Morocco who are required to enter Moroccan territory before continuing to a third-country destination. It generally permits a short stay of up to 72 hours and is usually valid for a single transit.
- Tourist visa or e-Visa: Travelers wishing to remain in Morocco beyond the permitted transit period or leave the airport during an extended layover must obtain an appropriate short-stay tourist visa or e-Visa instead of a transit visa.

== See also ==
- Visa requirements for Moroccan citizens
