= Tunisian passport =

Passport issued to citizens of Tunisia

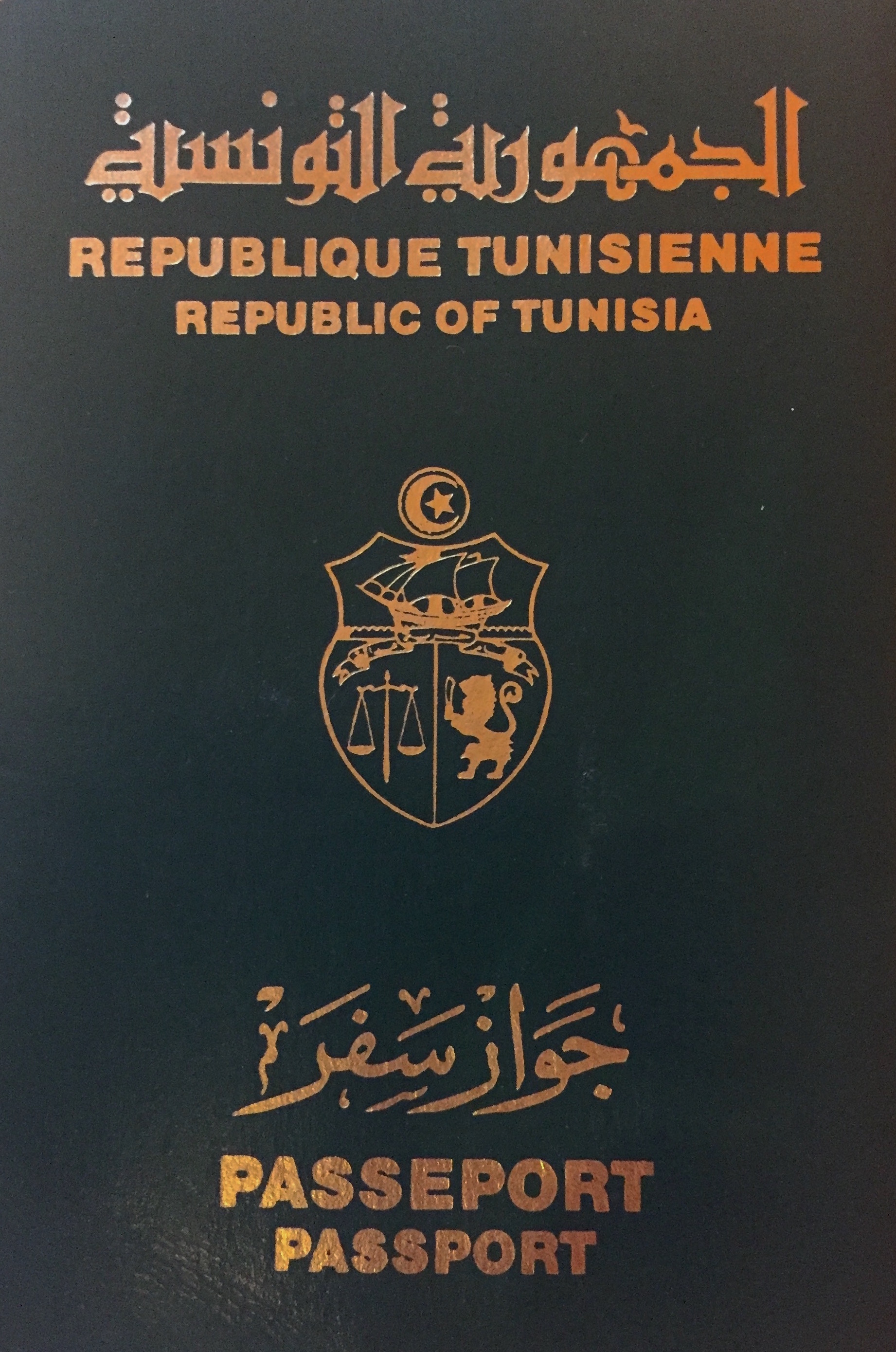
- Tunisian passport front cover
- Type: Passport
- Issued by: Tunisia
- First issued: 1 September 2003 (current version)
- Purpose: Identification
- Eligibility: Tunisian citizenship
- Expiration: 5 years

The Tunisian passport is issued to citizens of Tunisia for international travel.

== Passport types ==
There are three types of passports:

- Regular green passport, issued to citizens for international travel, valid for five years
- Special burgundy passport (passeport spécial), issued to Tunisians travelling on official business
- Diplomatic navy blue passport, issued to Tunisian diplomats and their eligible relatives

All Tunisian passports comply with ICAO standards. They contain 32 pages.

The first machine-readable passports were issued in 2003.

== Cover design ==
The Tunisian passport has the following wording on its cover :

Top: "الجمهورية التونسية" "RÉPUBLIQUE TUNISIENNE" "REPUBLIC OF TUNISIA"

Middle: The Coat of arms of Tunisia

Bottom: "جواز سفر " "PASSEPORT" "PASSPORT"

== Visa requirements map ==
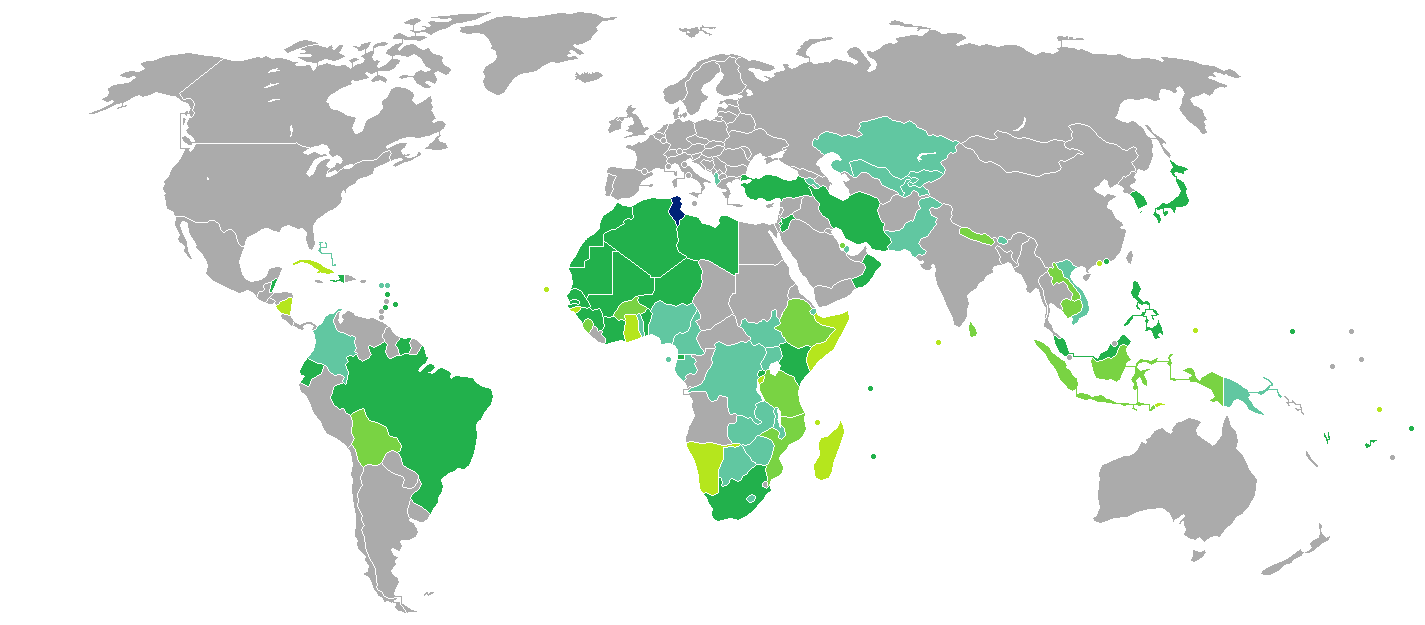
Countries and territories with visa-free or visa on arrival entry for holders of regular Tunisian passports Tunisia Visa free access Visa on arrival eVisa Visa available both on arrival or online Visa required

Visa requirements for Tunisian citizens are administrative entry restrictions by the authorities of other states placed on citizens of Tunisia. As of April 2025, Tunisian citizens had visa-free or visa on arrival access to 67 countries and territories, ranking the Tunisian passport 73rd in terms of travel freedom (tied with the passports of Armenia, Benin and Cape Verde), according to the Henley Passport Index.

== Gallery of historic images ==
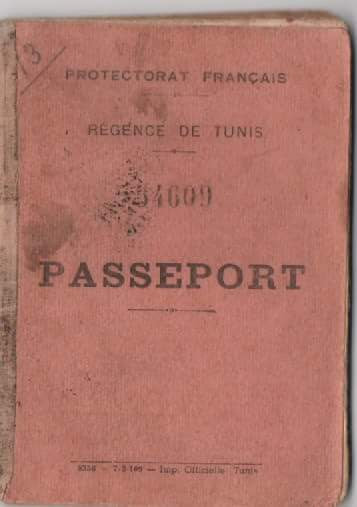
Tunisian Passport from 1951

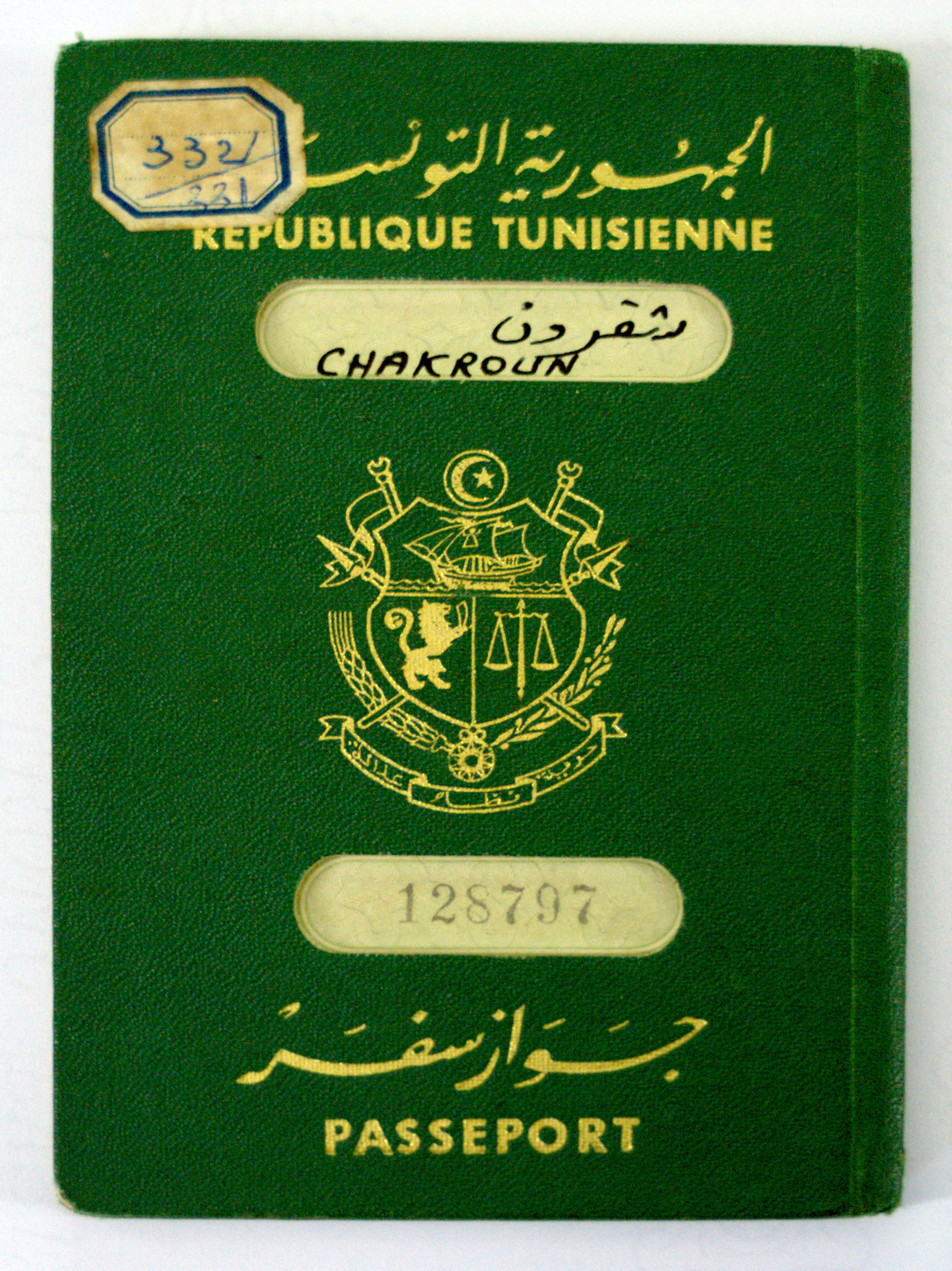
Tunisian Passport from 1964

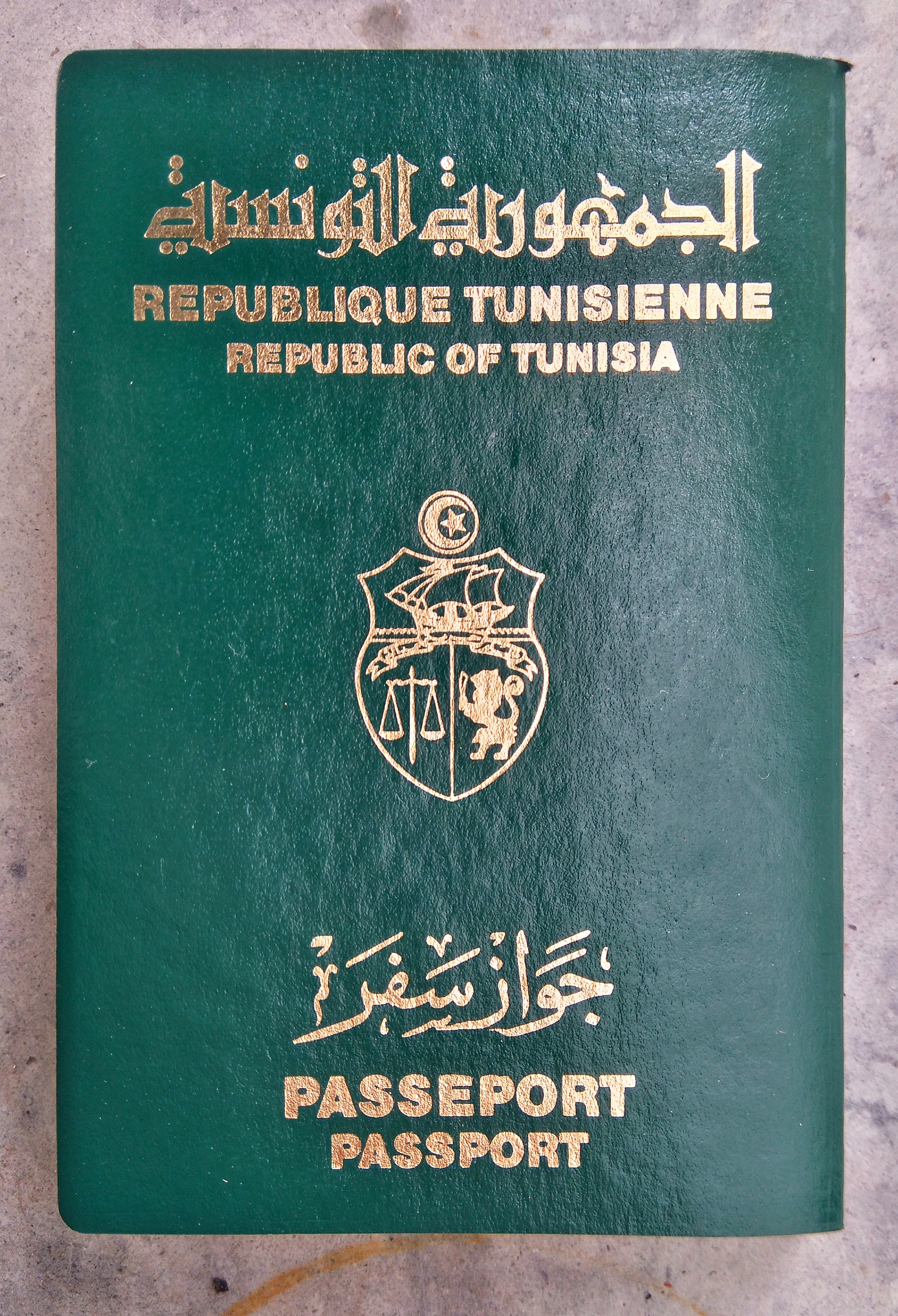
Tunisian Passport from 2003

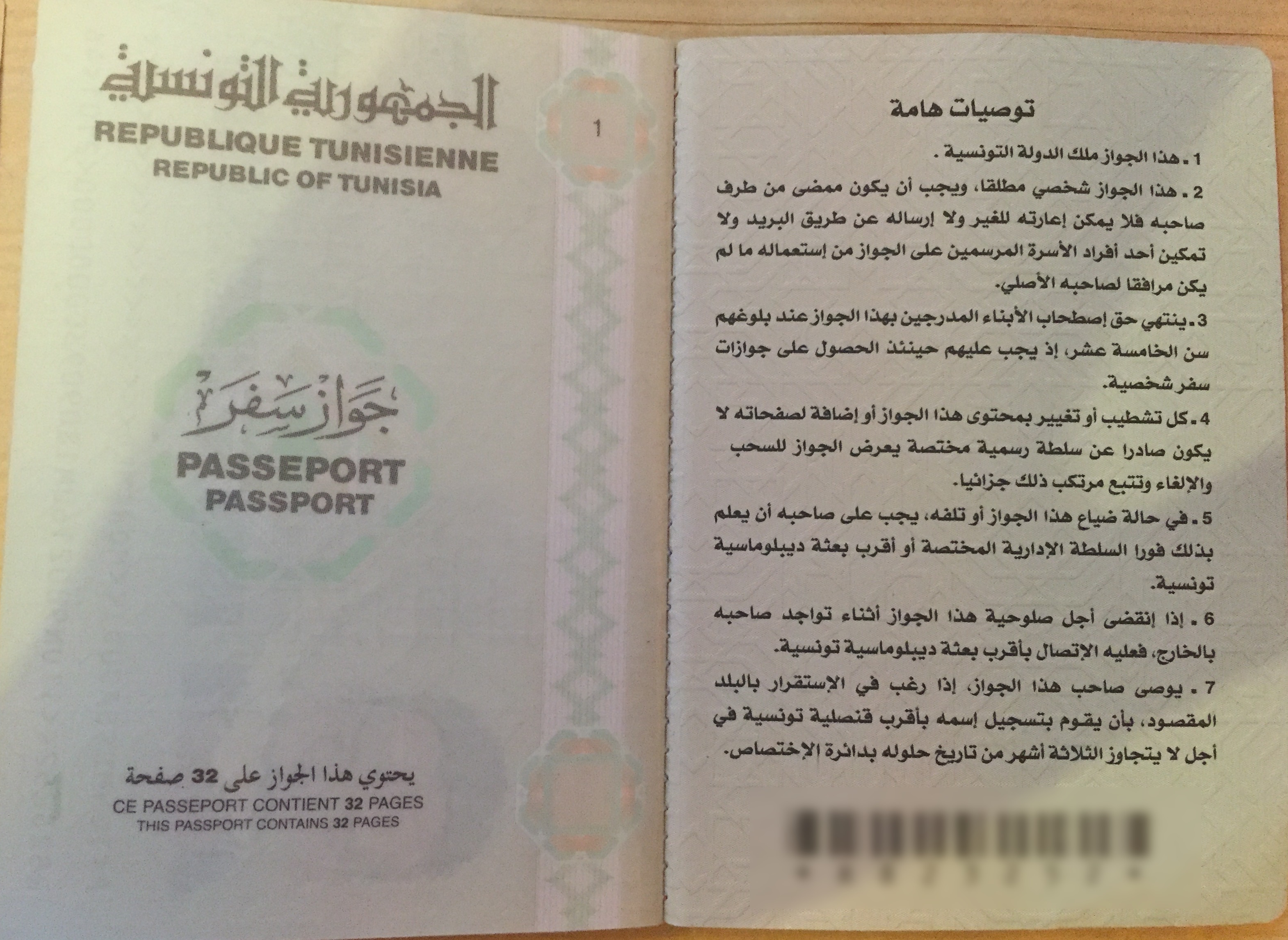
First page of a Tunisian non-biometric passport

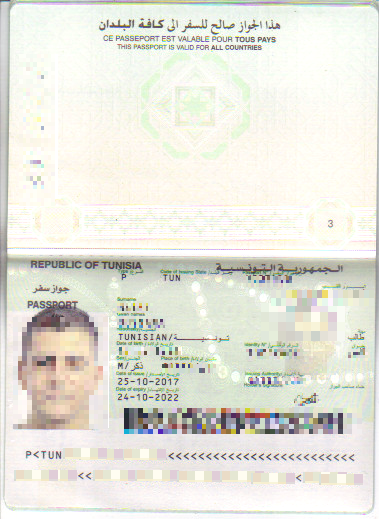
Biodata page of a Tunisian non-biometric passport

== See also ==
- Visa requirements for Tunisian citizens
