= List of diplomatic missions of Tunisia =

This is a list of diplomatic missions of Tunisia.

Honorary consulates and trade missions are omitted from this listing.

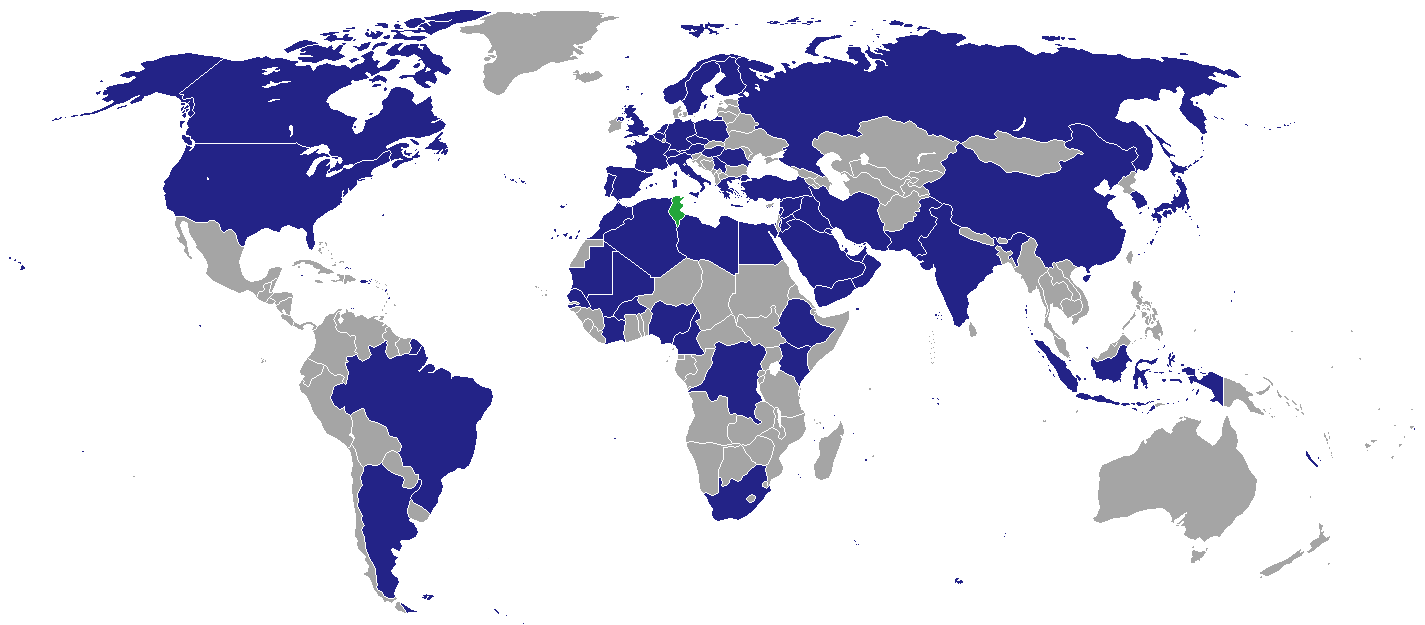
Diplomatic missions of Tunisia

== Africa ==
| Host country | Host city | Mission | Concurrent accreditation | Ref. |
|---|---|---|---|---|
| Algeria | Algiers | Embassy | | |
| Algeria | Annaba | Consulate | | |
| Algeria | Tébessa | Consulate | | |
| Burkina Faso | Ouagadougou | Embassy | Countries: Niger | |
| Cameroon | Yaoundé | Embassy | Countries: Chad; Gabon; Equatorial Guinea; São Tomé and Príncipe | |
| Congo-Kinshasa | Kinshasa | Embassy | Countries: Angola; Central African Republic; Congo-Brazzaville; Zambia | |
| Egypt | Cairo | Embassy | | |
| Ethiopia | Addis Ababa | Embassy | Countries: Djibouti; Madagascar; Seychelles; International Organizations: African Union; United Nations Economic Commission for Africa | |
| Ivory Coast | Abidjan | Embassy | Countries: Liberia; Togo | |
| Kenya | Nairobi | Embassy | Countries: Burundi; Malawi; Rwanda; Tanzania; Uganda; International Organizations: United Nations; United Nations Environment Programme; United Nations Human Settlements Programme | |
| Libya | Tripoli | Embassy | | |
| Libya | Benghazi | Consulate-General | | |
| Mali | Bamako | Embassy | Countries: Guinea | |
| Mauritania | Nouakchott | Embassy | | |
| Morocco | Rabat | Embassy | | |
| Nigeria | Abuja | Embassy | Countries: Benin; Ghana; Sierra Leone | |
| Senegal | Dakar | Embassy | Countries: Cape Verde; Gambia; Guinea-Bissau | |
| South Africa | Pretoria | Embassy | Countries: Botswana; Eswatini; Lesotho; Mauritius; Mozambique; Namibia; Zimbabwe | |

== Americas ==
| Host country | Host city | Mission | Concurrent accreditation | Ref. |
|---|---|---|---|---|
| Argentina | Buenos Aires | Embassy | Countries: Bolivia; Chile; Paraguay; Peru; Uruguay | |
| Brazil | Brasília | Embassy | Countries: Colombia; Ecuador; Venezuela | |
| Canada | Ottawa | Embassy | Countries: Cuba | |
| Canada | Montreal | Consulate | Countries: Cuba | |
| United States | Washington, D.C. | Embassy | Countries: Mexico; International Organizations: Organization of American States (Note: Accredited as an observer mission.) | |

== Asia ==
| Host country | Host city | Mission | Concurrent accreditation | Ref. |
|---|---|---|---|---|
| Bahrain | Manama | Embassy | | |
| China | Beijing | Embassy | Countries: Cambodia; Laos; Mongolia; North Korea; Vietnam | |
| India | New Delhi | Embassy | Countries: Maldives; Nepal; Sri Lanka | |
| Indonesia | Jakarta | Embassy | Countries: Australia; Brunei; Malaysia; Philippines; Singapore; Thailand; International Organizations: Association of Southeast Asian Nations | |
| Iran | Tehran | Embassy | Countries: Kyrgyzstan; Tajikistan; Uzbekistan | |
| Iraq | Baghdad | Embassy | | |
| Japan | Tokyo | Embassy | | |
| Jordan | Amman | Embassy | | |
| Kuwait | Kuwait City | Embassy | | |
| Lebanon | Beirut | Embassy | | |
| Oman | Muscat | Embassy | Countries: Comoros | |
| Pakistan | Islamabad | Embassy | Countries: Afghanistan; Bangladesh | |
| Palestine | Ramallah | Liaison office | | |
| Qatar | Doha | Embassy | | |
| Saudi Arabia | Riyadh | Embassy | | |
| Saudi Arabia | Jeddah | Consulate-General | | |
| South Korea | Seoul | Embassy | | |
| Syria | Damascus | Embassy | | |
| United Arab Emirates | Abu Dhabi | Embassy | | |
| United Arab Emirates | Dubai | Consulate-General | | |
| Turkey | Ankara | Embassy | | |
| Turkey | Istanbul | Consulate-General | | |

== Europe ==
| Host country | Host city | Mission | Concurrent accreditation | Ref. |
|---|---|---|---|---|
| Austria | Vienna | Embassy | Countries: Bosnia and Herzegovina; Croatia; Slovenia | |
| Belgium | Brussels | Embassy | Countries: Luxembourg; International Organizations: European Union | |
| Czech Republic | Prague | Embassy | | |
| Finland | Helsinki | Embassy | Countries: Estonia | |
| France | Paris | Embassy | Countries: Monaco | |
| France | Lyon | Consulate-General | Countries: Monaco | |
| France | Marseille | Consulate-General | Countries: Monaco | |
| France | Nice | Consulate-General | Countries: Monaco | |
| France | Strasbourg | Consulate-General | Countries: Monaco | |
| France | Grenoble | Consulate | Countries: Monaco | |
| France | Pantin | Consulate | Countries: Monaco | |
| France | Toulon | Consulate | Countries: Monaco | |
| France | Toulouse | Consulate | Countries: Monaco | |
| Germany | Berlin | Embassy | | |
| Germany | Düsseldorf (Note: Originally established in Bonn, the consulate-general was transferred to Düsseldorf in May 2025.) | Consulate-General | | |
| Germany | Hamburg | Consulate | | |
| Germany | Munich | Consulate | | |
| Greece | Athens | Embassy | Countries: Albania | |
| Hungary | Budapest | Embassy | Countries: Slovakia | |
| Italy | Rome | Embassy | Countries: Cyprus; San Marino | |
| Italy | Milan | Consulate-General | Countries: Cyprus; San Marino | |
| Italy | Bologna | Consulate | Countries: Cyprus; San Marino | |
| Italy | Genoa | Consulate | Countries: Cyprus; San Marino | |
| Italy | Naples | Consulate | Countries: Cyprus; San Marino | |
| Italy | Palermo | Consulate | Countries: Cyprus; San Marino | |
| Malta | Valletta (Note: Although officially titled as an embassy in Valletta, its chancery is physically located in the town of Attard.) | Embassy | | |
| Netherlands | The Hague | Embassy | | |
| Norway | Oslo | Embassy | Countries: Iceland | |
| Portugal | Lisbon | Embassy | | |
| Poland | Warsaw | Embassy | Countries: Latvia; Lithuania; Ukraine | |
| Romania | Bucharest | Embassy | Countries: Moldova | |
| Russia | Moscow | Embassy | Countries: Armenia; Belarus; Kazakhstan; Turkmenistan | |
| Serbia | Belgrade | Embassy | Countries: Bulgaria; Montenegro; North Macedonia | |
| Spain | Madrid | Embassy | | |
| Sweden | Stockholm | Embassy | Countries: Denmark | |
| Switzerland | Bern | Embassy | Countries: Holy See; Liechtenstein | |
| United Kingdom | London | Embassy | Countries: Ireland | |

== Multilateral organisations ==
- Arab League
  - Cairo (Permanent Mission)
- United Nations
  - Geneva (Permanent Mission)
  - New York City (Permanent Mission) (Note: Also accredited to Guatemala.)

== Gallery ==
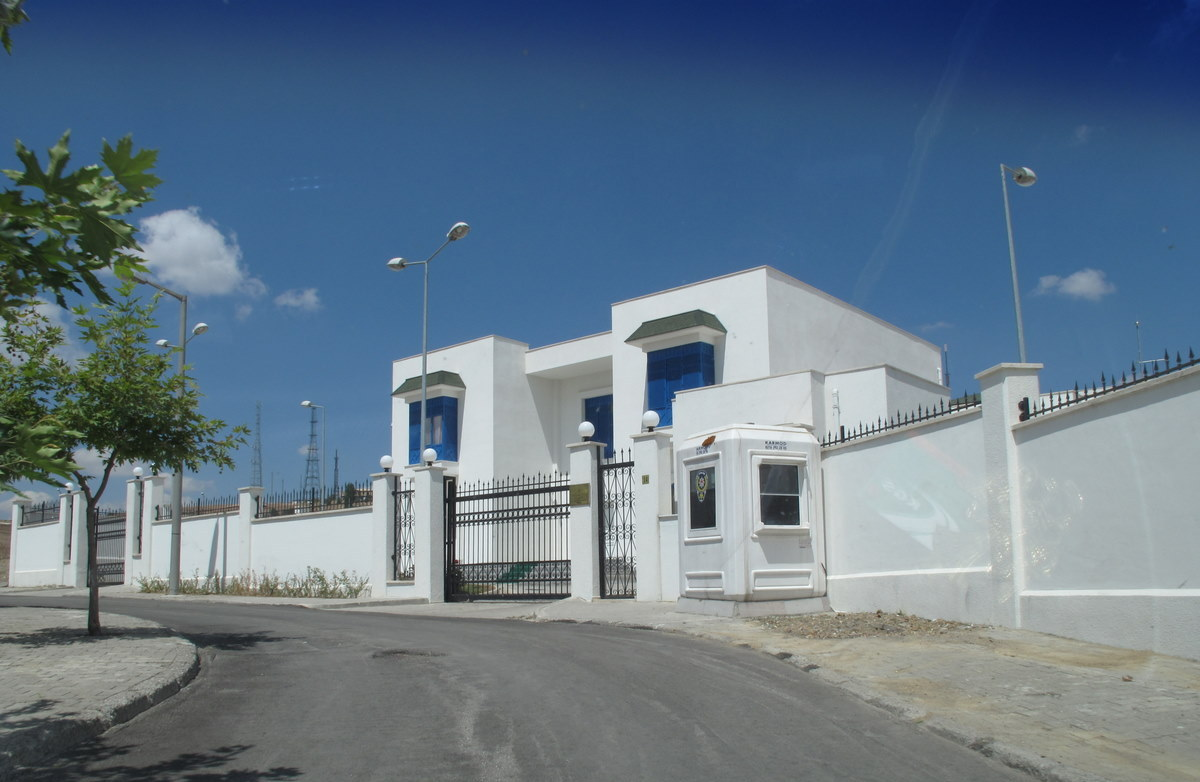
Embassy in Ankara

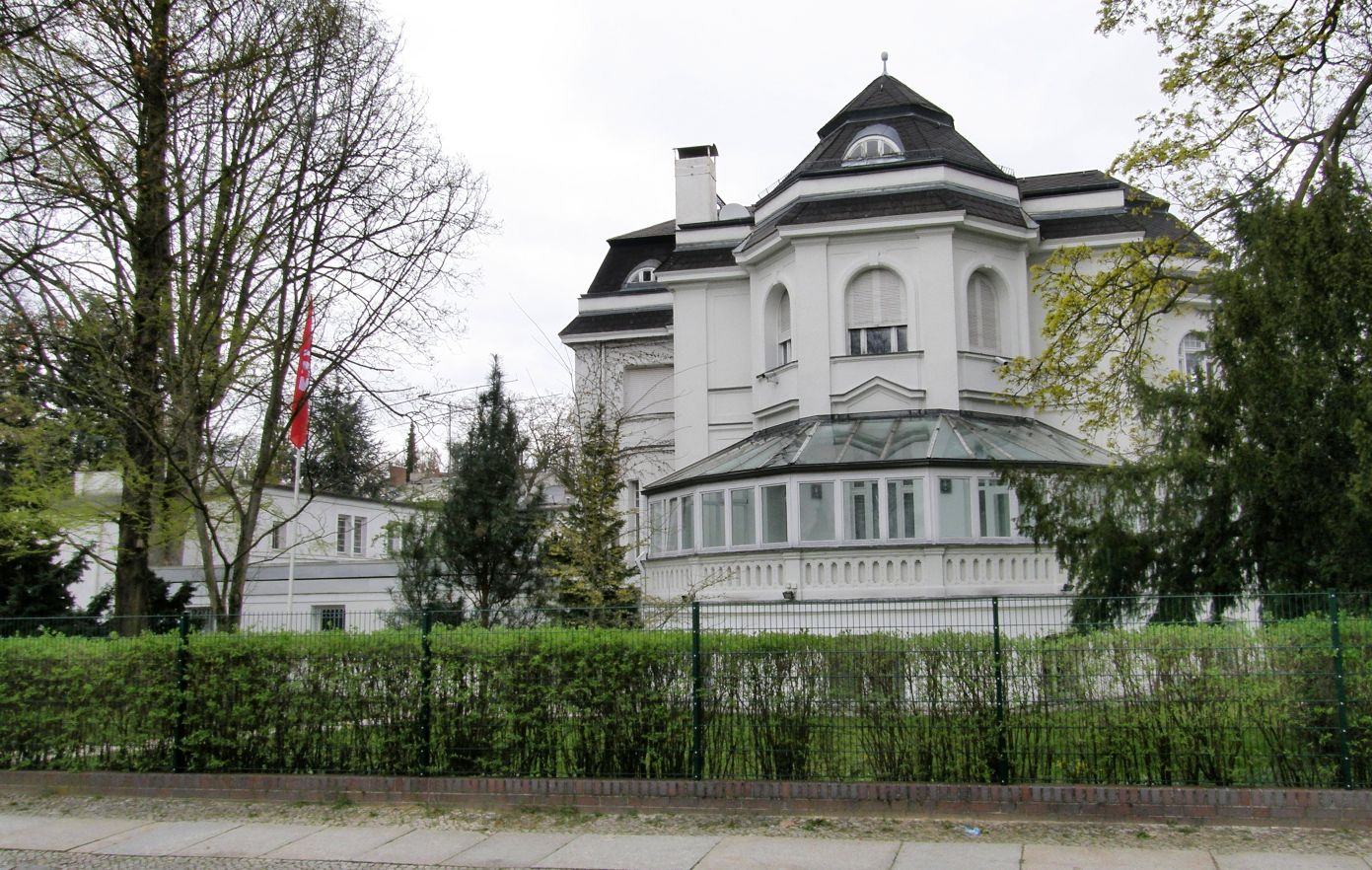
Embassy in Berlin

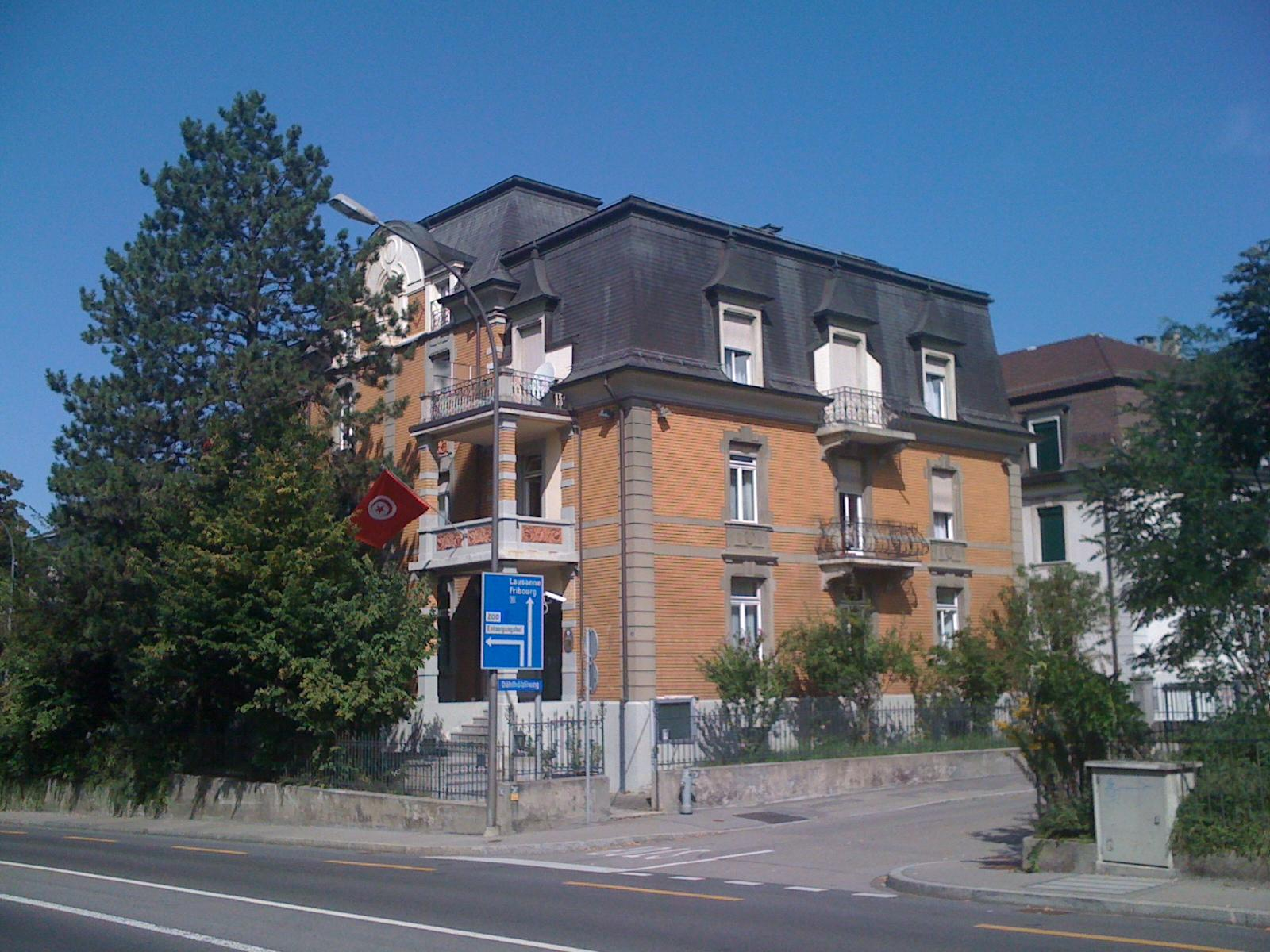
Embassy in Bern

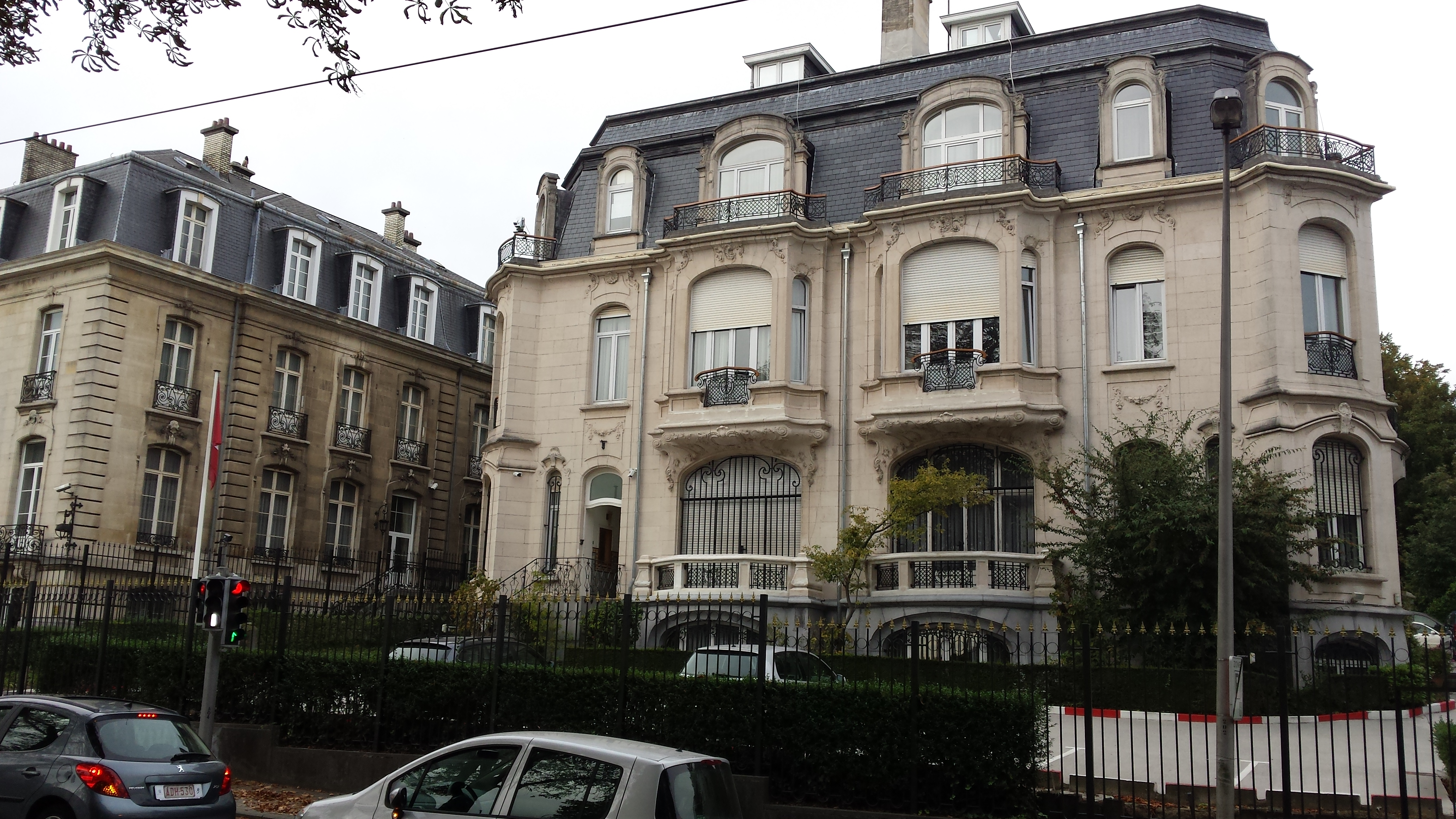
Embassy in Brussels

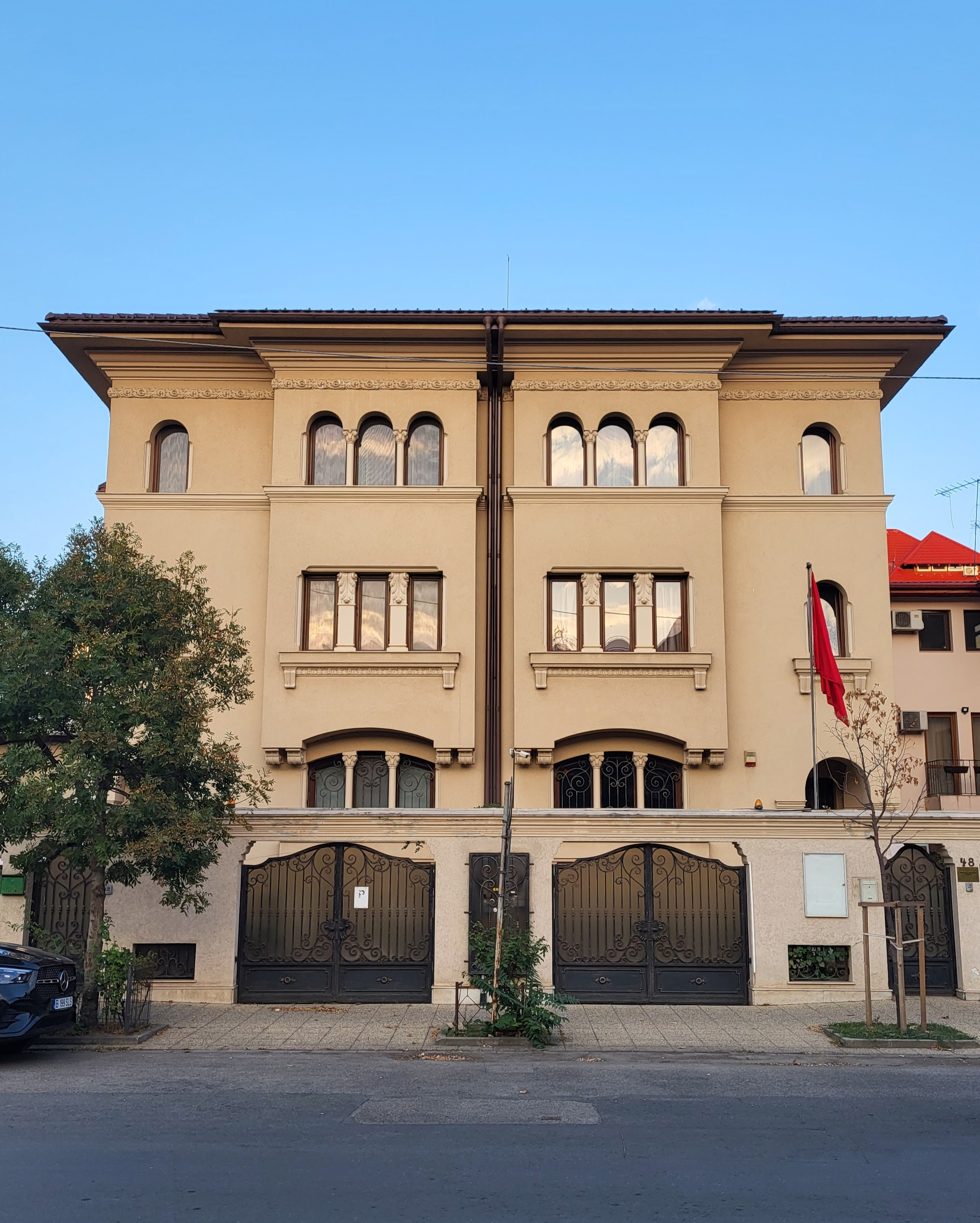
Embassy in Bucharest

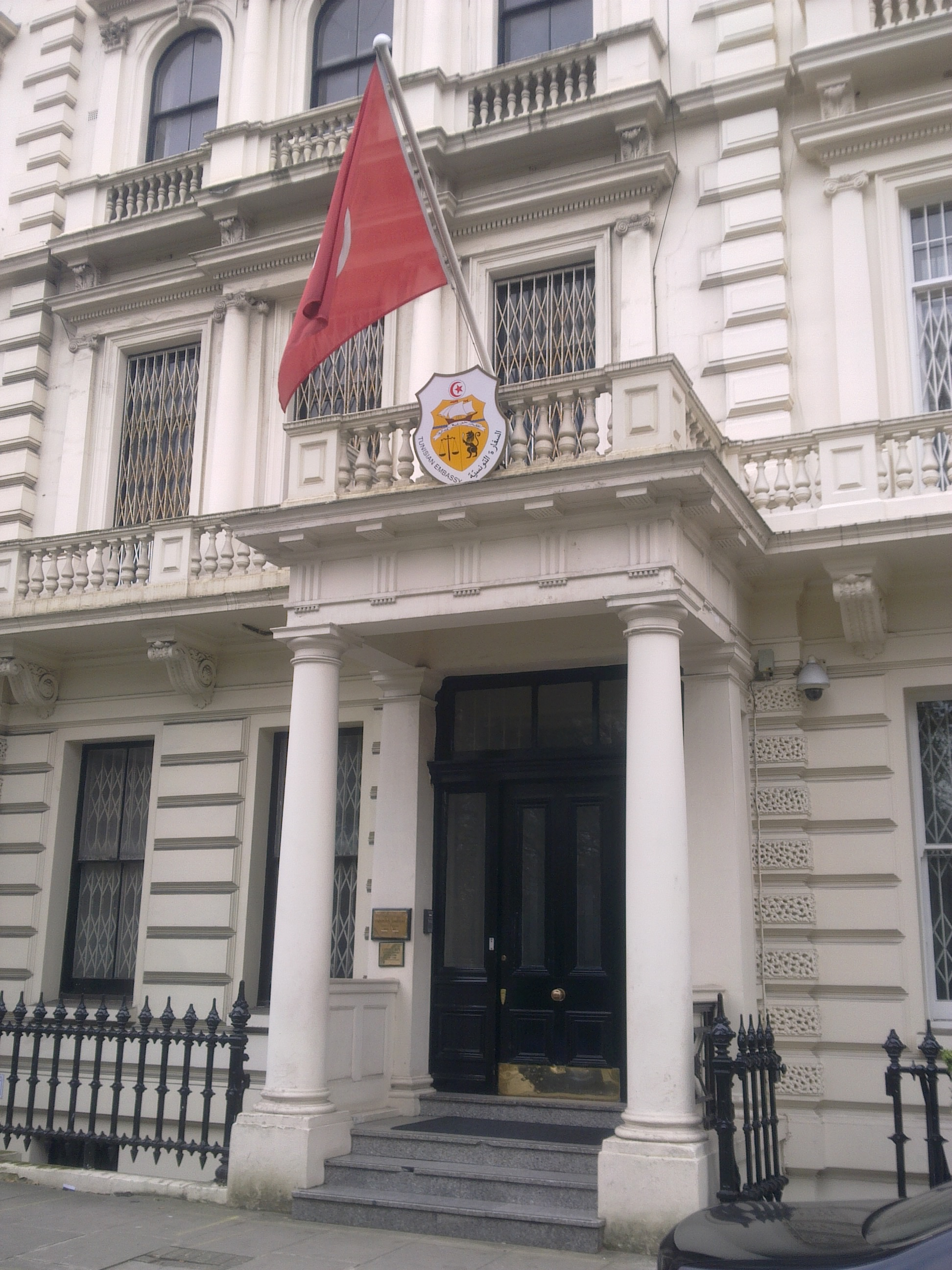
Embassy in London

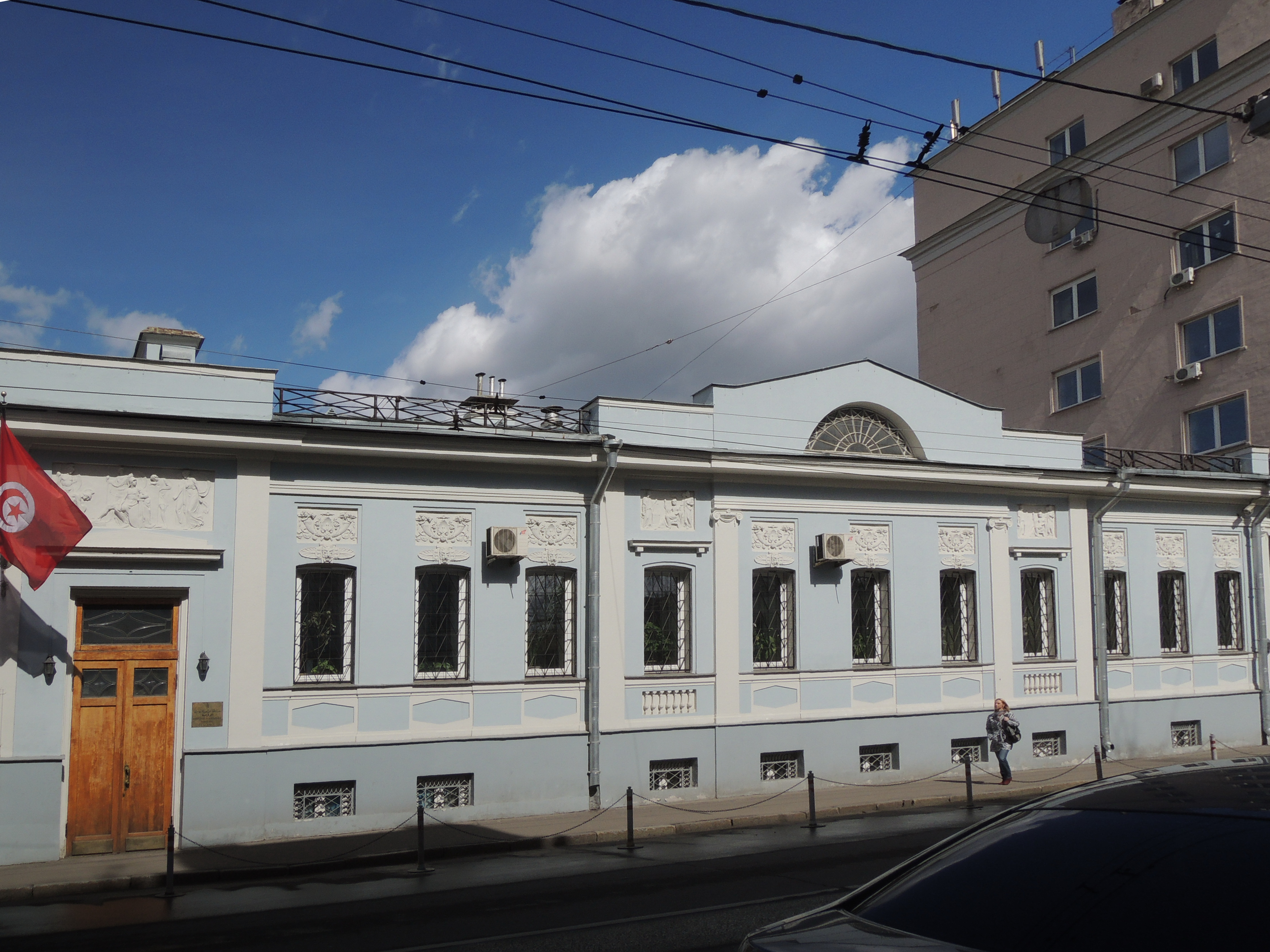
Embassy in Moscow

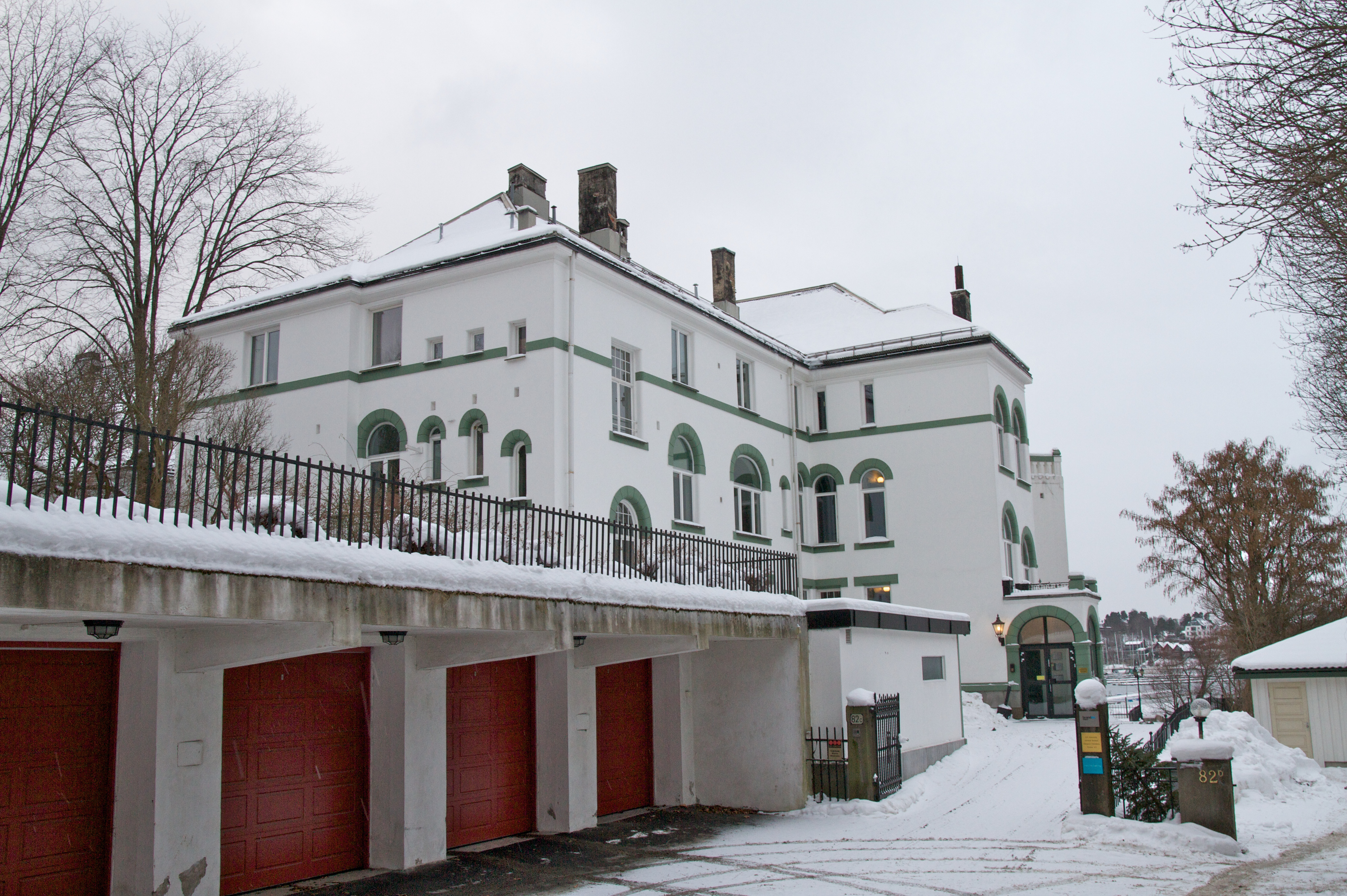
Embassy in Oslo

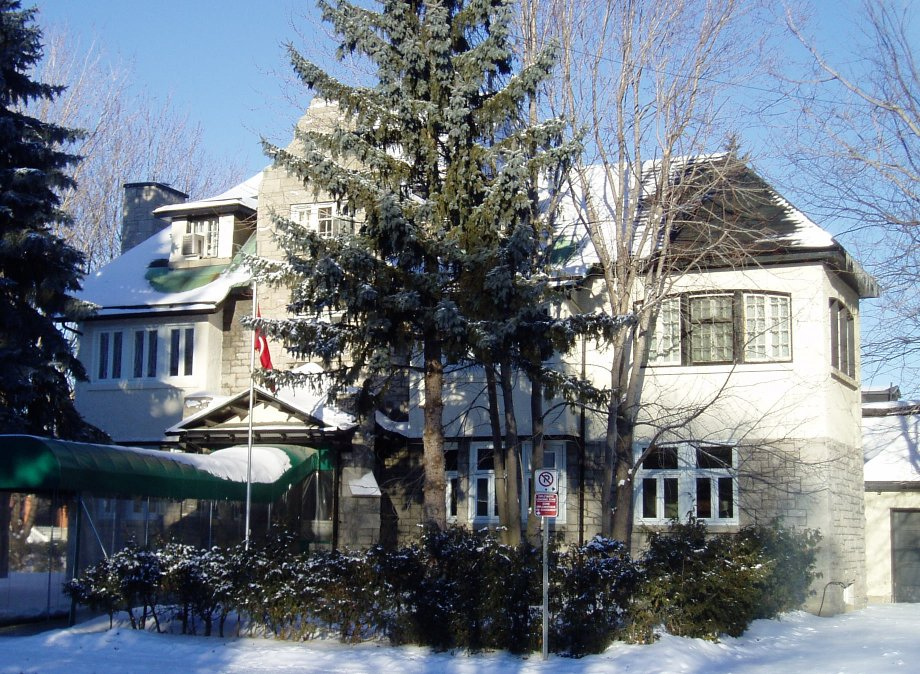
Embassy in Ottawa

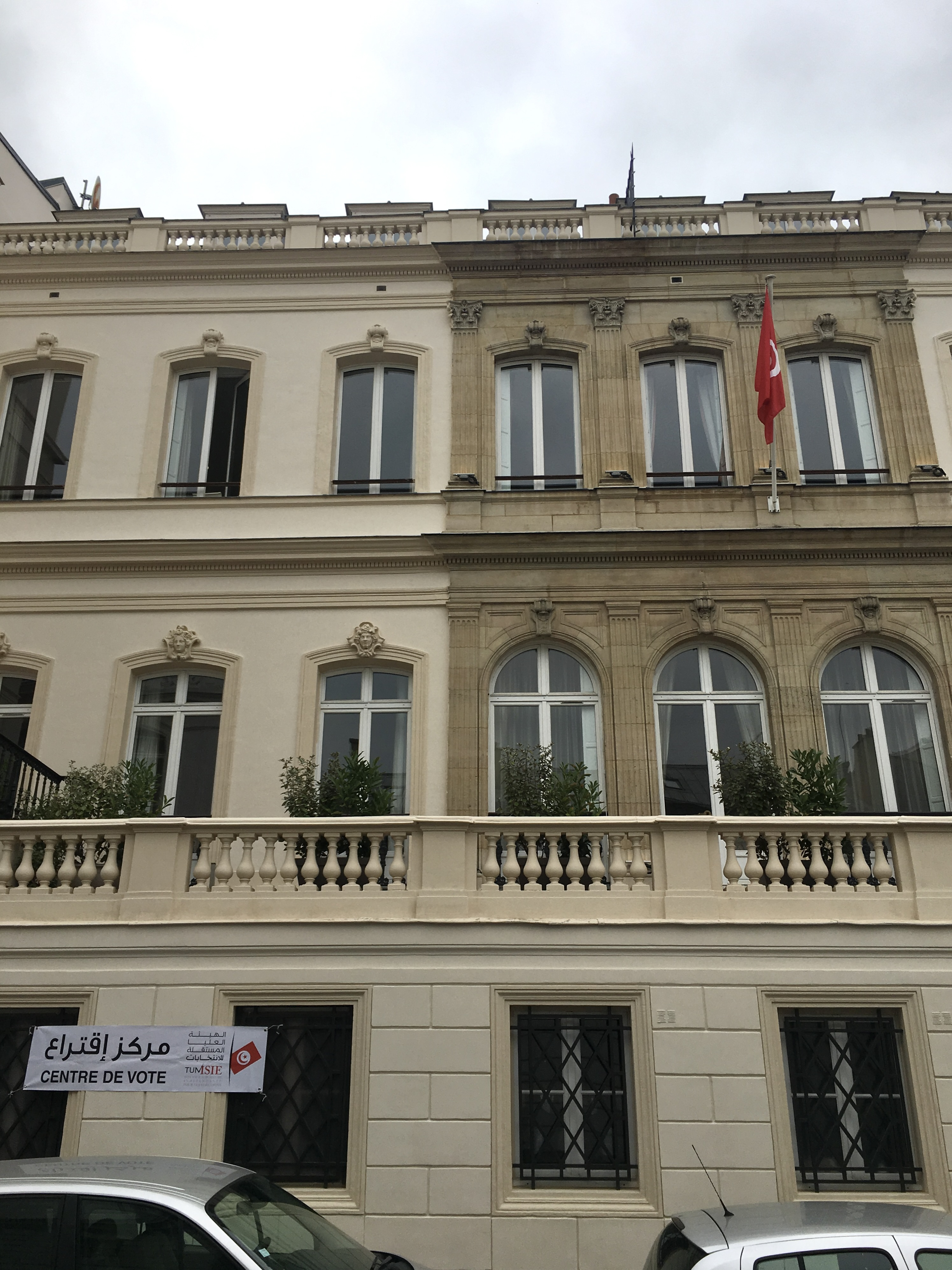
Embassy in Paris

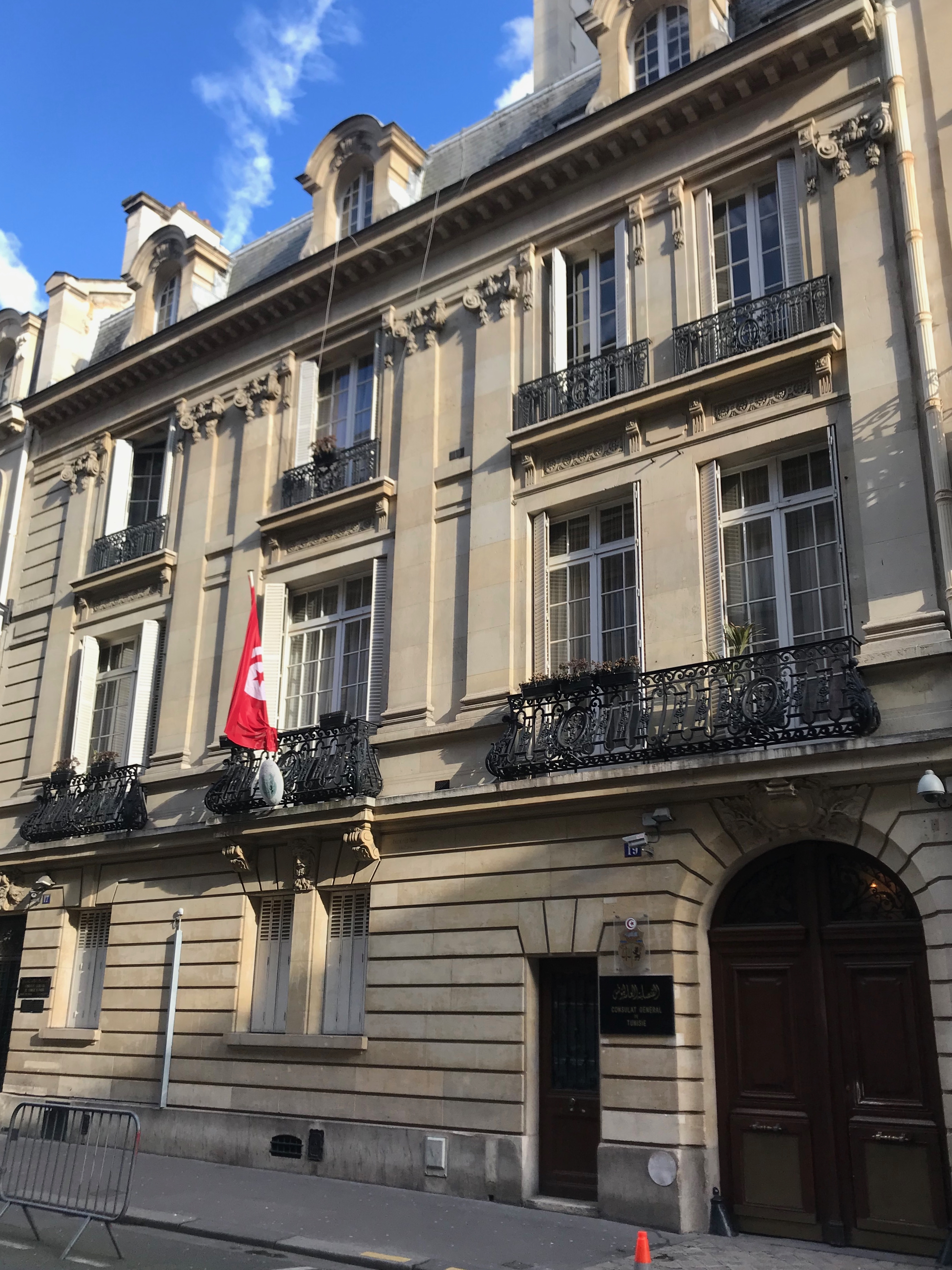
Consulate-General in Paris

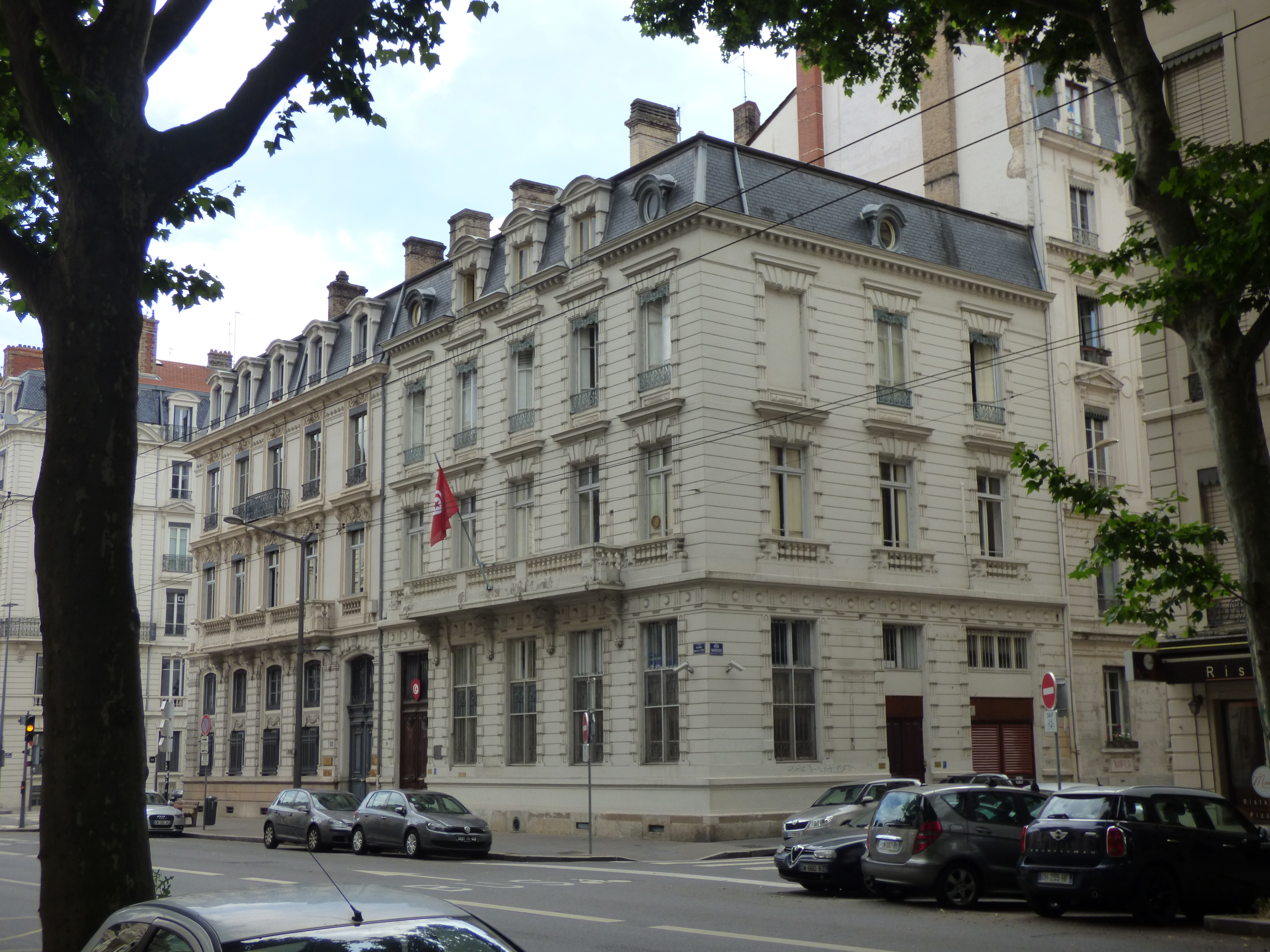
Consulate-General in Lyon

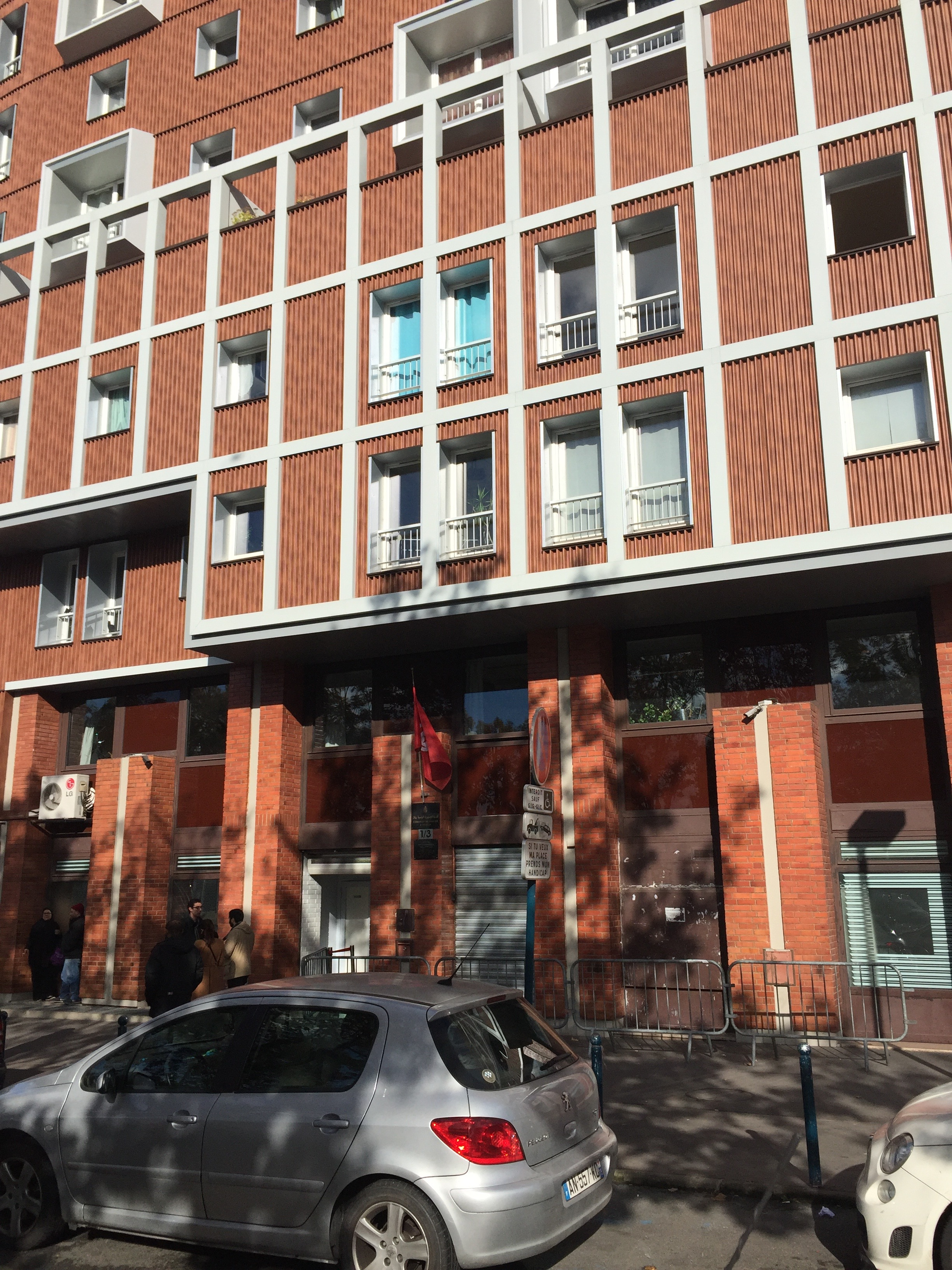
Consulate in Pantin

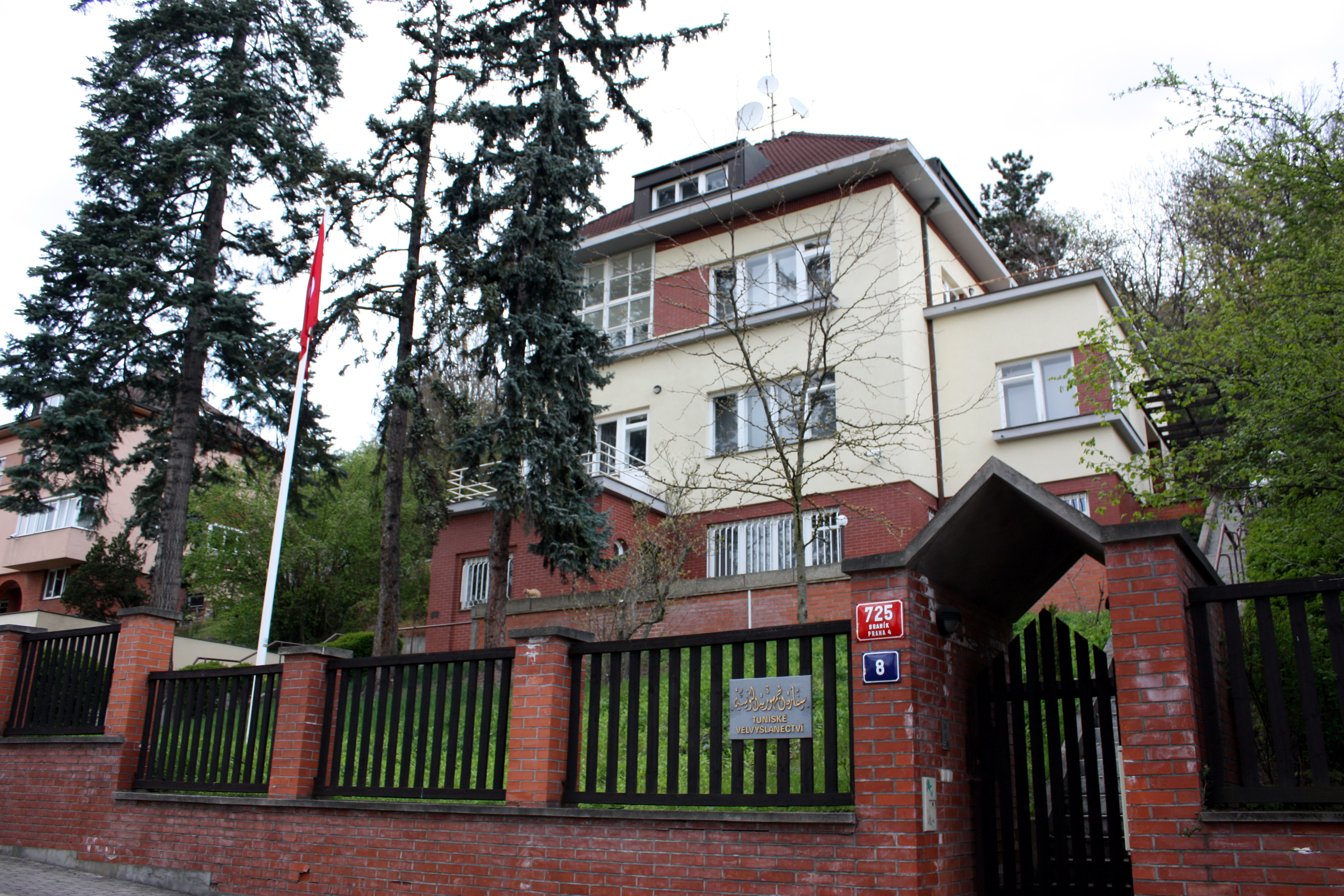
Embassy in Prague

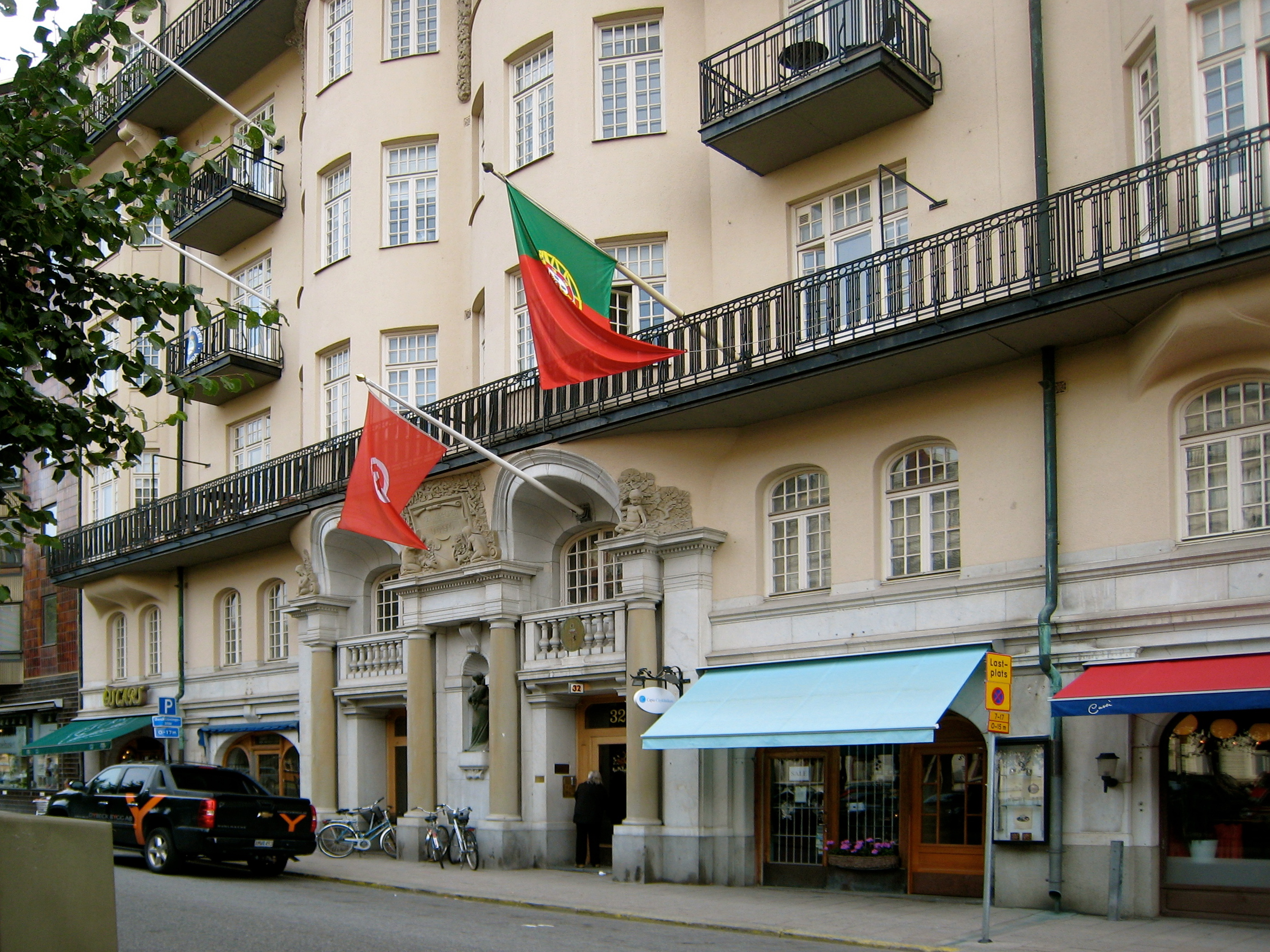
Embassy in Stockholm

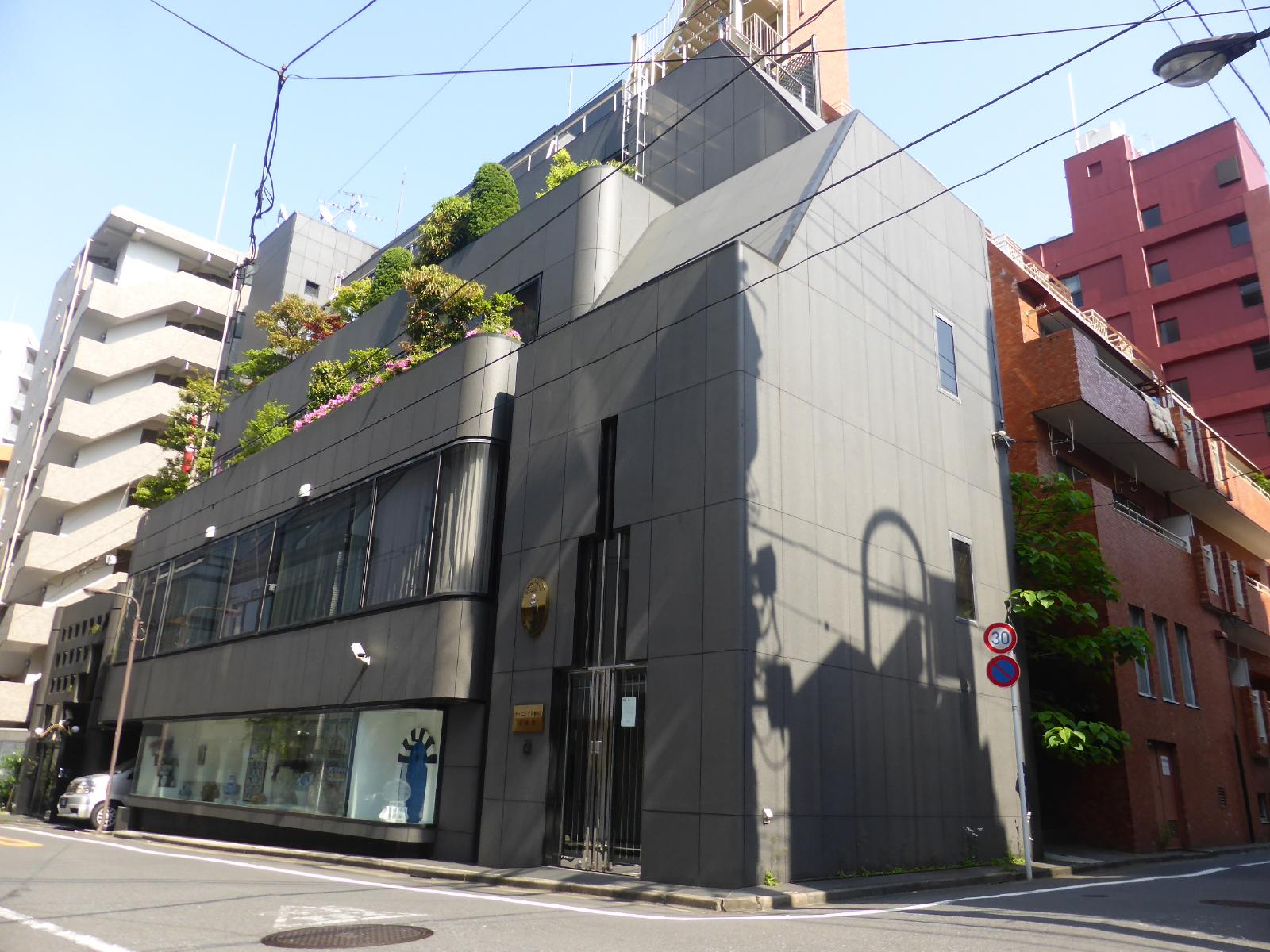
Embassy in Tokyo

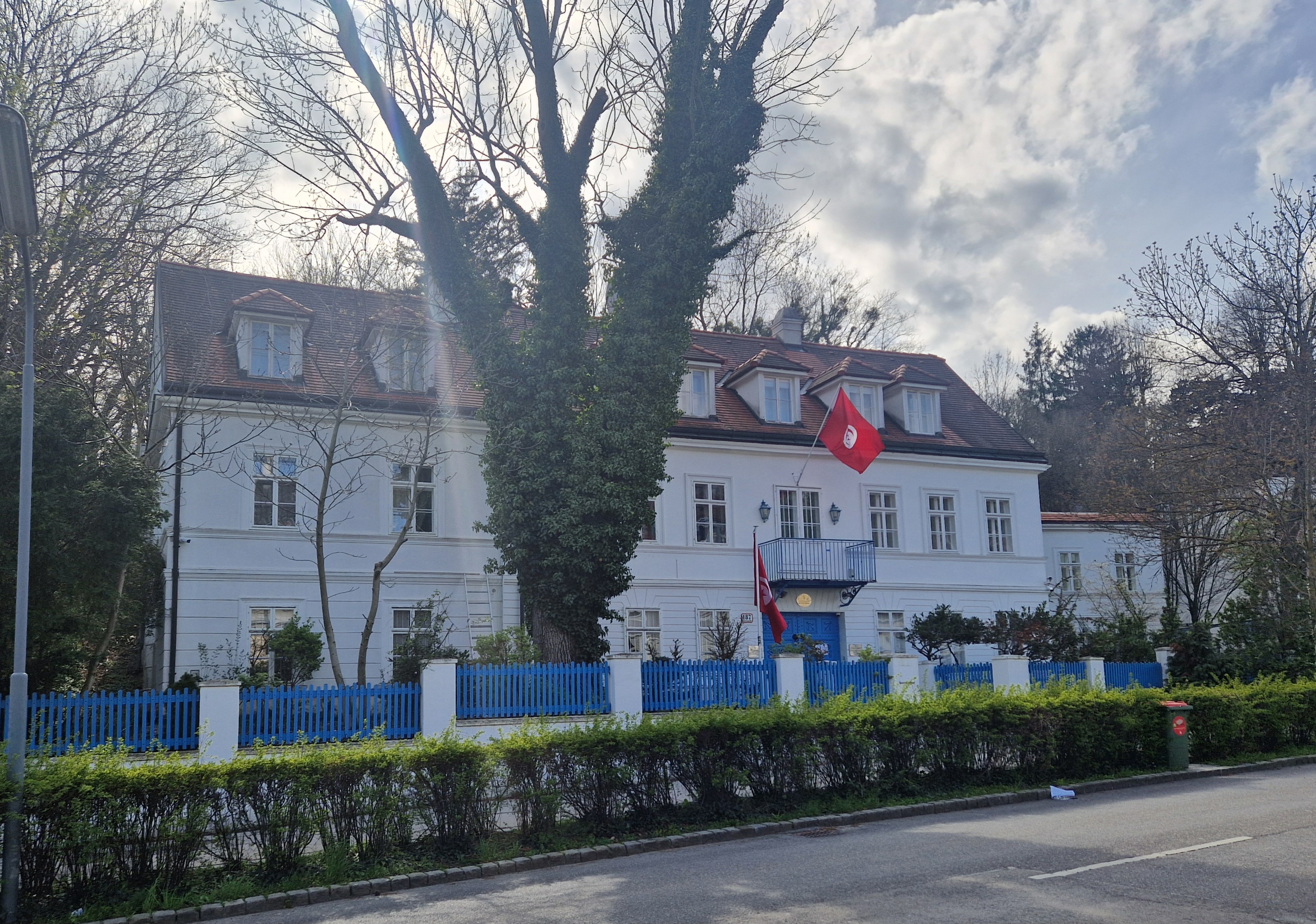
Embassy in Vienna

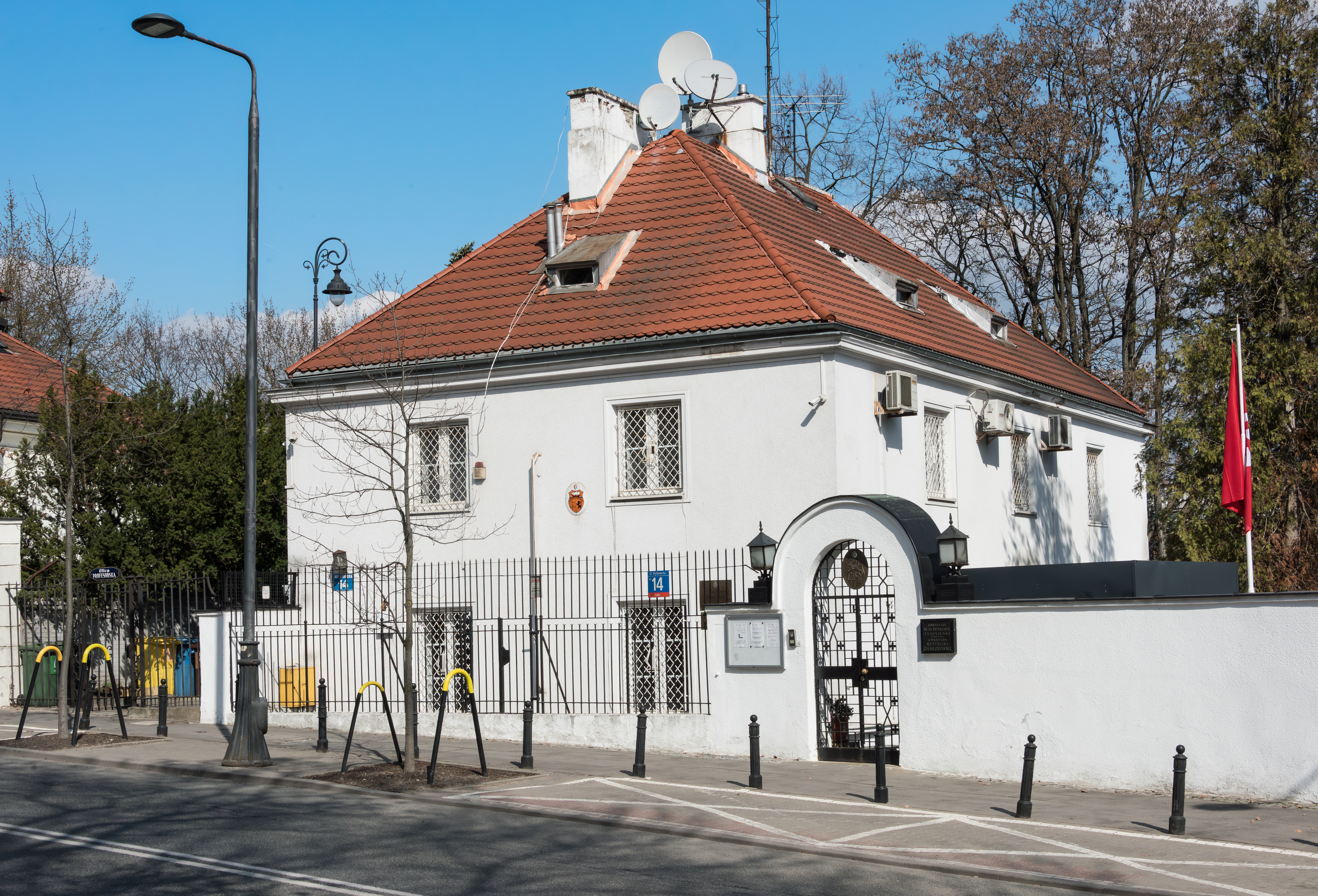
Embassy in Warsaw

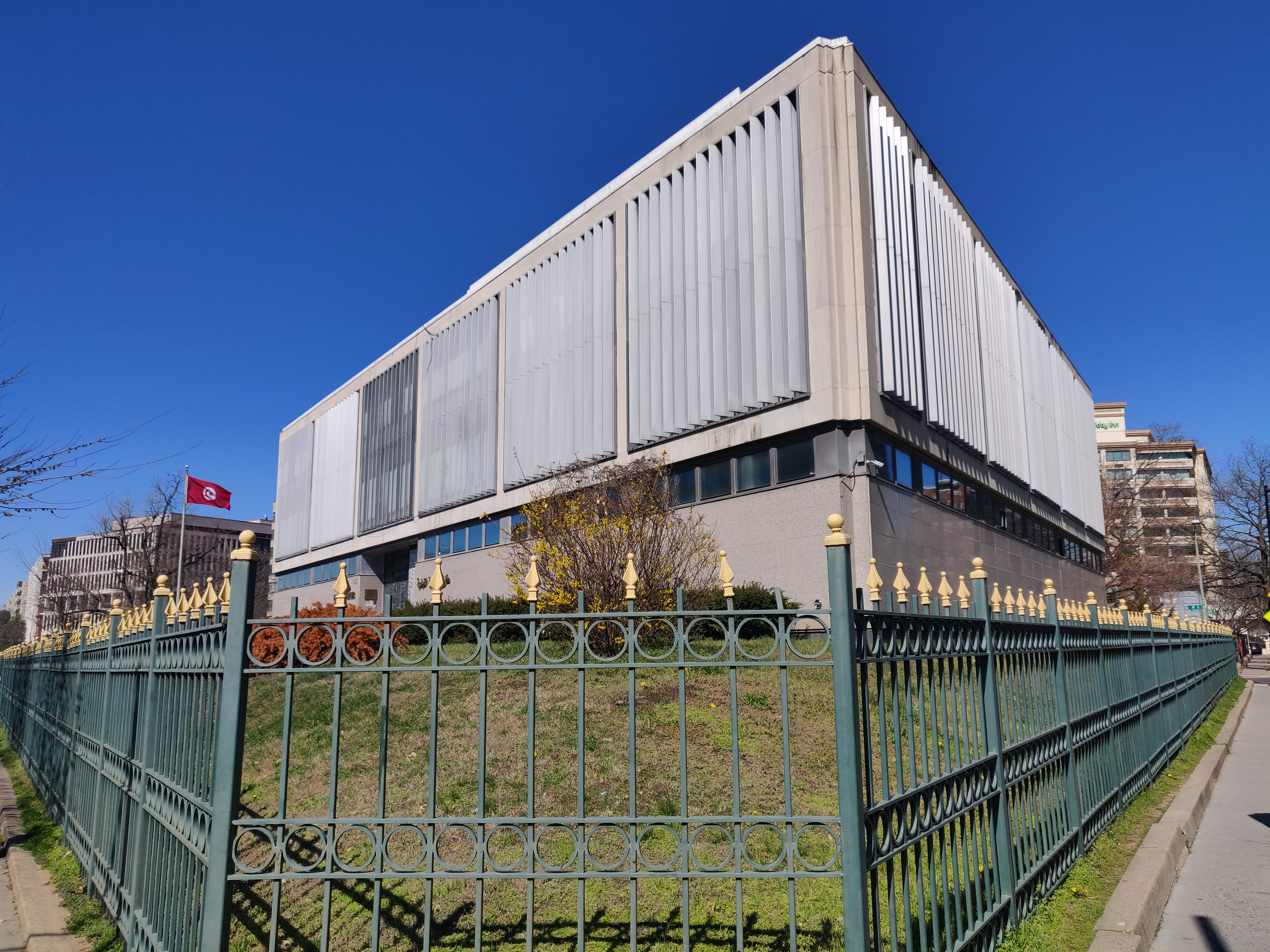
Embassy in Washington, D.C.

== See also ==
- Foreign relations of Tunisia
- Visa policy of Tunisia
