= Visa policy of Tunisia =

Policy on permits required to enter Tunisia

Visitors to Tunisia must obtain a visa from one of the Tunisian diplomatic missions unless they are citizens from one of the visa-exempt countries.

== Visa policy map ==
Visa policy of Tunisia Tunisia Visa not required (4 months) Visa not required (90 days) Visa not required (2 months) Visa not required (15 days) Visa not required for organized tours; otherwise, visa required Visa required

== Visa exemption ==
=== Ordinary passports ===
Citizens of the following countries and territories may enter Tunisia without a visa for the following period:

4 months

- Canada
- Germany

90 days

- European Union member states (except Bulgaria, Cyprus and Germany)

- Algeria
- Andorra
- Angola
- Antigua and Barbuda
- Argentina
- Australia
- Bahrain
- Barbados
- Belarus
- Bosnia and Herzegovina
- Brazil
- Brunei
- Burkina Faso
- Cape Verde
- Chile
- China
- Comoros
- Costa Rica
- Dominica
- Equatorial Guinea
- Fiji
- Gabon
- Gambia
- Guinea
- Guinea Bissau
- Hong Kong
- Honduras
- Iceland
- Indonesia
- Ivory Coast
- Japan
- Jordan
- Kazakhstan
- Kiribati
- Kuwait
- Libya
- Liechtenstein
- Malaysia
- Maldives
- Mali
- Mauritania
- Mauritius
- Mexico
- Moldova
- Monaco
- Montenegro
- Morocco
- Namibia
- New Zealand
- Niger
- North Macedonia
- Norway
- Oman
- Qatar
- Russia
- Saint Kitts and Nevis
- Saint Lucia
- San Marino
- Saudi Arabia
- Senegal
- Seychelles
- Singapore
- Solomon Islands
- South Africa
- South Korea
- Switzerland
- Turkey
- United Arab Emirates
- United Kingdom
- United States
- Vatican City

2 months

- Bulgaria

15 days within any 180 days

- Iran
- Iraq

Date of visa changes
- 14 June 1956: Japan
- April 1966: Yugoslavia (applies today to Bosnia and Herzegovina, Croatia, North Macedonia, Montenegro, Serbia and Slovenia)
- 1 January 1996: Argentina
- 1 December 2014: Russia
- 17 February 2017: China (for organized Tours)
- 15 December 2017: Benin
- 7 October 2023: China
- 14 June 2024: Iran and Iraq (tourist purposes only)

=== Organized tours ===
Citizens of following countries may enter Tunisia without a visa if travelling on an organised tour and holding a hotel voucher:

- Azerbaijan
- Benin
- Georgia
- India
- Kyrgyzstan
- Tajikistan
- Turkmenistan
- Ukraine
- Uzbekistan

=== Non-ordinary passports ===
Holders of diplomatic or official/service passports of China, Egypt, India, Indonesia, Jordan, Philippines, Singapore, Thailand and Ukraine and holders of diplomatic passports of Albania, Cuba, Czech Republic, Iran, Pakistan, Uruguay and Vietnam may enter Tunisia without a visa for up to 90 days.

== Electronic visa (e-Visa) ==
In September 2024, Tunisia launched an international tender to develop a national e-Visa platform aimed at simplifying entry procedures for non-exempt foreign nationals. However, in August 2025, the tender was declared unsuccessful after all submitted bids failed to meet the required technical and administrative standards.

== See also ==
- Visa requirements for Tunisian citizens
