= Visa requirements for Tunisian citizens =

Travel regulations abroad

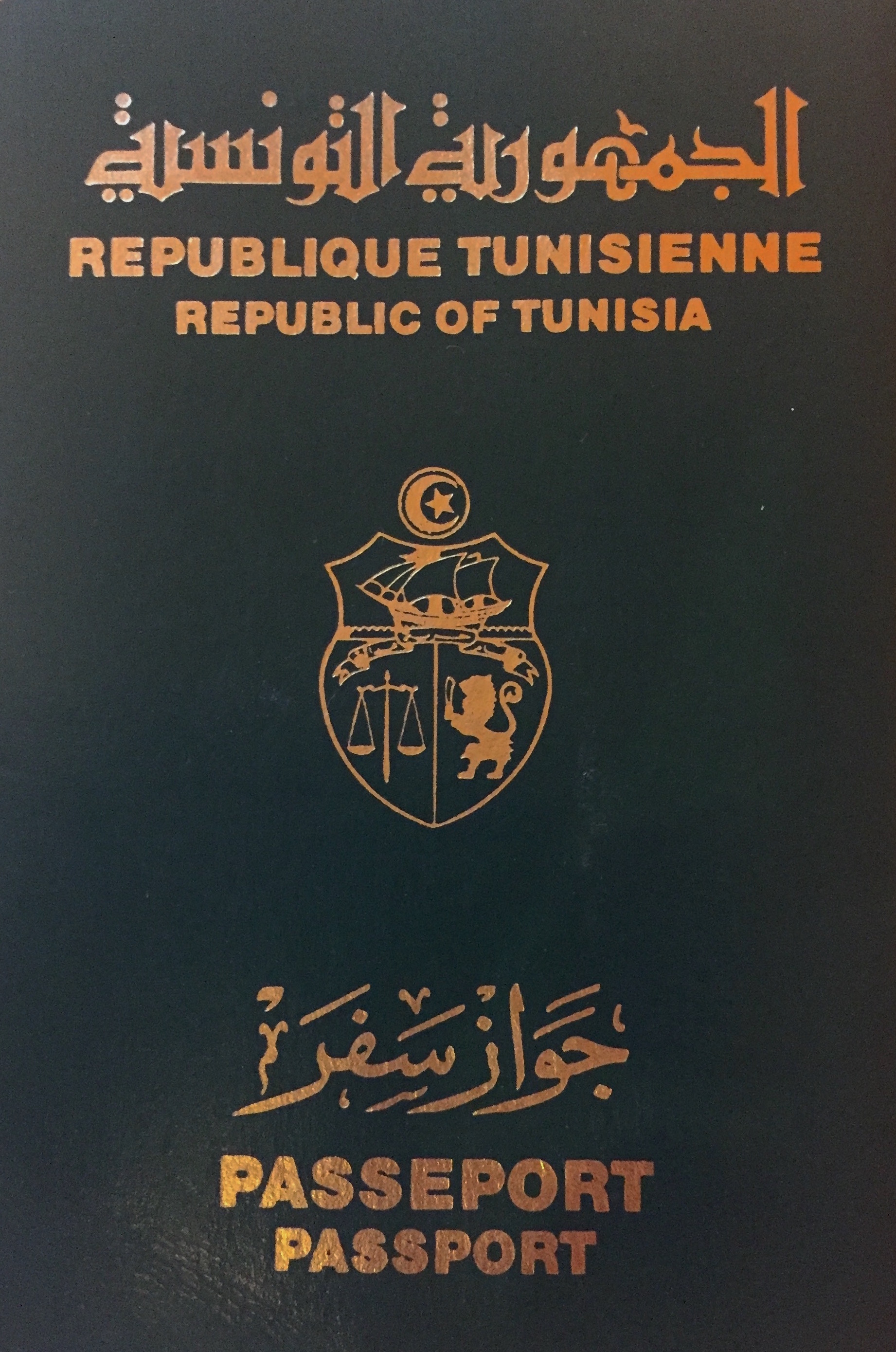
A Tunisian passport

Visa requirements for Tunisian citizens are administrative entry restrictions by the authorities of other states placed on citizens of Tunisia.

As of 2026, Tunisian citizens had visa-free or visa on arrival access to 66 countries and territories, ranking the Tunisian passport 69th in the world according to the Henley Passport Index.

== Visa requirements map ==
Visa requirements for Tunisian citizens holding ordinary passports Tunisia Visa not required Visa not required (conditional) Visa on arrival eVisa Visa available both on arrival or online Visa required

== Visa requirements ==
Country	Visa requirement	Allowed stay	Notes (excluding departure fees)
Afghanistan	eVisa	30 days	Visa is not required in case born in Afghanistan or can proof that one of their parents is a national of Afghanistan or born in Afghanistan.; e-Visa : Visitors must arrive at Kabul International (KBL).
Albania	eVisa	90 days	Visa not required for holders of a multiple entry visa issued by the United Kingdom, if having used the visa to enter the United Kingdom at least once, for a maximum stay of 90 days.; Visa not required for holders of a multiple entry C visa issued by a Schengen Member State, if having used the visa to enter the Schengen Area at least once, for a maximum stay of 90 days.; Visa not required for holders of a multiple entry D visa issued by a Schengen Member State, if having used the visa to enter the Schengen Area at least once, for a stay of more than 90 days within 180 days.
Algeria	Visa not required	90 days	
Andorra	Visa required		The Andorran government imposes no visa requirements on its visitors and only requires a passport for entrance. However, since the country is only accessible via the Schengen countries Spain or France, entrance is not possible without entering the Schengen area first and the Schengen visa rules can therefore be regarded to apply de facto. Because Andorra is not part of the Schengen area, a multiple entry visa is required to re-enter the Schengen area when leaving Andorra.
Angola	eVisa	30 days	30 days per trip, but no more than 90 days within any 1 calendar year for tourism purposes only.; Visitors must have a return/onward ticket and a hotel reservation confirmation.; An International Certificate of Vaccination is required.
Antigua and Barbuda	eVisa		
Argentina	Visa required		
Armenia	eVisa	120 days	Visa on arrival for a maximum stay of 120 days for valid visa holders or holding residence permit of the EU or Schengen Area member states, Australia, Canada, the United Kingdom, Ireland, Japan, South Korea, Russia and the United States or holding residence permit of the GCC member states.
Australia and territories	Visa required		May apply online (Online Visitor e600 visa).
Austria	Visa required		
Azerbaijan	Visa required		Holders of a pre-arranged approval may obtain visa on arrival.
Bahamas	eVisa	3 months	
Bahrain	eVisa / Visa on arrival	14 days	
Bangladesh	Visa on arrival	30 days	
Barbados	Visa not required	6 months	
Belarus	Visa required		Holders of a pre-arranged approval may obtain visa on arrival.
Belgium	Visa required		
Belize	Visa not required		
Benin	Visa not required	90 days	
Bhutan	eVisa	90 days	The Sustainable Development Fee (SDF) of 200 USD per person, per night for almost all visitors to Bhutan. Additionally, if payment is made in US dollars from September 1, 2023 to August 31, 2027, the SDF is 100 USD.
Bolivia	Online Visa		
Bosnia and Herzegovina	Visa required		Passengers with a multiple-entry visa issued by the US or a Schengen Member State for a maximum stay of 30 days. The visa must be valid for the period of intended stay. A total of 90 days is granted within 6 months..
Botswana	eVisa	3 months	
Brazil	Visa not required	90 days	
Brunei	Visa required		
Bulgaria	Visa required		
Burkina Faso	eVisa / Visa on arrival		
Burundi	Online Visa / Visa on arrival	1 month	
Cambodia	eVisa / Visa on arrival	30 days	
Cameroon	eVisa		Holders of a pre-arranged approval issued by "Le Delegue General de la Surete" can obtain a visa on arrival.
Canada	Visa required		
Cape Verde	Visa required		
Central African Republic	Visa required		
Chad	eVisa		
Chile	Visa required		
China	Visa required		
Colombia	Online Visa		
Comoros	Visa on arrival	45 days	
Republic of the Congo	Visa required		
Democratic Republic of the Congo	eVisa	7 days	
Costa Rica	Visa required		Visa free for Passengers with a valid visa issued by the US for at least 6 months from date of arrival for a maximum stay of 30 days.; Costa Rican visas should be issued within 60 days after the date of issuance.; Departure tax applies
Côte d'Ivoire	Visa not required	90 days	
Croatia	Visa required		
Cuba	eVisa	90 days	Visa not required for a maximum stay of 3 months within 6 months for holders of Diplomatic, Service, and Official; Passengers are required to have a travel insurance to cover their medical expenses while in Cuba and should be purchased before departure.
Cyprus	Visa required		
Czech Republic	Visa required		
Denmark	Visa required		
Djibouti	eVisa	90 days	Passengers with a passport valid for a minimum of 6 months from the arrival date can obtain a visa on arrival.; Must hold a return/onward ticket.
Dominica	Visa not required	21 days	
Dominican Republic	Visa required		Visa-free for Passengers with a valid visa issued by Bulgaria, Canada, Croatia, Cyprus, Ireland, Romania, the US, United Kingdom or a Schengen Member State.
Ecuador	Visa not required	90 days	
Egypt	Visa required		Visa exemption for whose traveling as part of an organized tourist group if the tourist group consists of at least 2 people and holding a signed guarantee letter from a travel agency.; Visa exemption for whose are younger than 14 for a maximum stay of 3 months.
El Salvador	Visa required		Visa-free for holders of a valid visa issued by Canada, the United States or a Schengen member state there is a processing fee of 10 USD to enter.
Equatorial Guinea	Visa not required	30 days	
Eritrea	Visa required		Holders of a confirmation of a pre-arranged visa can obtain a visa on arrival.
Estonia	Visa required		
Eswatini	Visa required		
Ethiopia	eVisa / Visa on arrival	90 days	Visa on arrival is obtainable only at Addis Ababa Bole International Airport.; e-Visa holders must arrive via Addis Ababa Bole International Airport.; e-Visa is available for 30 or 90 days.
Fiji	Visa not required	4 months	
Finland	Visa required		
France	Visa required		
Gabon	eVisa	90 days	e-Visa holders must arrive via Libreville International Airport.
Gambia	Visa not required		An entry clearance must be obtained from the Gambian Immigration prior to travel.
Georgia	Visa required		Passengers with a visa issued by an EEA Member State, Bahrain, Bermuda, Canada, Cayman Islands, Falkland Islands, Gibraltar, Israel, Japan, South Korea, Kuwait, New Zealand, Oman, Qatar, Saudi Arabia, Switzerland, Turks and Caicos Islands, the US, United Arab Emirates or British Virgin Islands for a maximum stay of 90 days. The maximum stay is granted within 180 days.
Germany	Visa required		
Ghana	Visa on arrival	30 days	
Greece	Visa required		
Grenada	Visa required		
Guatemala	Visa required		Visa-free for holders of a valid visa issued by Canada, the United States or a Schengen member state.
Guinea	Visa not required	90 days	
Guinea-Bissau	Visa on arrival	90 days	
Guyana	eVisa		Conditional VoA can be obtained.
Haiti	Visa not required	3 months	
Honduras	Visa required		Visa-free for holders of a valid visa issued by Canada, the United States or a Schengen member state.
Hungary	Visa required		
Iceland	Visa required		
India	Visa required		
Indonesia	e-VOA / Visa on arrival	30 days	
Iran	Visa not required	15 days	15 days within a 180-day period; Visa not required for tourism purposes only
Iraq	eVisa	30 days	
Ireland	Visa required		
Israel	Visa required		Confirmation from Israeli Foreign Ministry is required before a visa is issued.
Italy	Visa required		
Jamaica	Visa required		
Japan	Visa not required	90 days	
Jordan	Visa not required	3 months	
Kazakhstan	Visa required		Kazakhstan e-Visa; E-Visa can be issued only if there is a valid invitation from the Kazakh side.; To apply for an e-Visa, you need an invitation number received from the inviting Kazakh side.; The issued electronic visa must be printed out for presentation at the state border crossing and on the territory of the Republic of Kazakhstan.; E-Visa gives the right to enter / exit the Republic of Kazakhstan only through the international airports of Astana and Almaty.; E-Visas are not issued to foreigners with whom children travel together.
Kenya	Visa not required	60 days	
Kiribati	Visa required		
North Korea	Visa required		
South Korea	Electronical Travel Authorization	30 days	The validity period of a K-ETA is 3 years from the date of approval.
Kuwait	Visa required		
Kyrgyzstan	eVisa	60 days	
Laos	eVisa / Visa on arrival	30 days	18 (Note: Savannakhet Airport; Lanetoui - Mengkang (China); Meuangmom - Wan Pong (Myanmar); Banvang - Ban Khok Phai (Thailand); Namngeun - Huay Kon (Thailand); Paksan - Bueng Kan (Thailand); Paktaphan - Pak Saeng (Thailand); Pangmon - Ban Huak (Thailand); Phoudou (Thailand); Dak ta ock - Nam Giang (Vietnam); La Lai (Vietnam); Namkan (Vietnam); Namphao - Cau Treo (Vietnam); Namsoy - Na Meo (Vietnam); Naphao - Cha Lo (Vietnam); Pahang - Long Sap (Vietnam); Panghok - Tây Trang (Vietnam); Phoukeua - Bo Y (Vietnam)) of the 33 border crossings are only open to regular visa holders.; e-Visa may be used to enter Laos through the Luang Prabang, Pakse and Vientiane international airports, 3 Thai-Lao Friendship Bridges (Note: Vientiane (Friendship Bridge 1); Savannakhet (Friendship Bridge 2); Bokeo (Friendship Bridge 4)), in Boten (road and railroad), and in Vientiane (at Khamsavath railway station).; Visa on arrival is available at the Luang Prabang, Pakse and Vientiane international airports, 4 Thai-Lao Friendship Bridges (Note: Vientiane (Friendship Bridge 1); Savannakhet (Friendship Bridge 2); Khammouane (Friendship Bridge 3); Bokeo (Friendship Bridge 4)) and 7 border crossings. (Note: Nongnokkheane - Trapeang Kriel (Cambodia); Boten - Bo han (China); Golden Triangle/Samliemkham (Thailand); Khamsavath railway station (Thailand); Namheuang - Ban Na Kraseng (Thailand); Vang tao - Chongmek (Thailand); Dansavan - Lao Bảo (Vietnam))
Latvia	Visa required		
Lebanon	Visa on arrival (Conditional)	30 days	Visa on arrival at Beirut International Airport or any other port of entry only if they are holding a copy of a reservation in a 3- to 5-star hotel or private residential address with a telephone number in the Republic of Lebanon, at least 2,000 USD in cash, a non-refundable return or round trip ticket, and there are no Israeli stamps, visas, or seals on their passport.
Lesotho	Visa required		
Liberia	e-VOA	3 months	
Libya	Visa not required		
Liechtenstein	Visa required		
Lithuania	Visa required		
Luxembourg	Visa required		
Madagascar	eVisa/Visa on arrival	90 days	For stays of 61 to 90 days, the visa fee is 59 USD.
Malawi	Visa required		
Malaysia	Visa not required	90 days	
Maldives	Free visa on arrival	30 days	
Mali	Visa not required		
Malta	Visa required		
Marshall Islands	Visa required		
Mauritania	Visa not required		
Mauritius	Visa not required	90 days	
Mexico	Visa required		
Micronesia	Visa not required	30 days	
Moldova	Visa required		Visitors holding a residence permit or a valid visa issued by one of the member states of the European Union or one of the parties to the Schengen Agreement can apply for an e-Visa.
Monaco	Visa required		
Mongolia	Visa required		
Montenegro	Visa required		Visa not required for holders of a visa, valid for the period of stay, issued by Australia, Bulgaria, Canada, Ireland (Rep.), Japan, New Zealand, Romania, the US, United Kingdom or a Schengen Member State for a maximum stay of 30 days.
Morocco	Visa not required	90 days	
Mozambique	eVisa / Visa on arrival	30 days	
Myanmar	Visa required		
Namibia	eVisa / Visa on arrival	3 months / 90 days	
Nauru	Visa required		
Nepal	Online Visa / Visa on arrival	90 days	
Netherlands	Visa required		
New Zealand	Visa required		Holders of an Australian Permanent Resident Visa or Resident Return Visa may be granted a New Zealand Resident Visa on arrival permitting indefinite stay (pursuant to the Trans-Tasman Travel Arrangement), subject to meeting character requirements and obtaining an Electronic Travel Authority prior to departure.
Nicaragua	Visa required		
Niger	Visa not required	3 months	
Nigeria	eVisa	30 days	
North Macedonia	Visa required		Visa not required for visiors with a multiple-entry visa issued by Canada, USA or United Kingdom or multiple-entry "C" visa issued by a Schengen Member State valid for at least 5 days longer than the duration of stay. Visitors can stay for a maximum of 90 days in a period of 6 months, with a maximum stay of 15 days per visit.
Norway	Visa required		
Oman	Visa required		Visa free for 14 days if residents or have a valid entry visa for one of the following countries (the United States of America, Canada, Australia, the United Kingdom, Schengen Agreement countries, Japan), or to be residents of one of the countries The Gulf Cooperation Council and its profession are among the professions that benefit from the resident visa.
Pakistan	eVisa	3 months	
Palau	Free visa on arrival	30 days	
Panama	Visa required		Visa required, except for Holders of a visa issued by Andorra, Australia, Canada, Iceland, Monaco, Liechtenstein, Norway, San Marino, Switzerland, the US or an EU Member State.
Papua New Guinea	eVisa	60 days	Visitors may apply for a visa online under the "Tourist - Own Itinerary" category.
Paraguay	Visa required		
Peru	Visa required		
Philippines	Visa not required	30 days	
Poland	Visa required		
Portugal	Visa required		
Qatar	eVisa		Travelers can apply for a visa on the Hayya website.
Romania	Visa required		
Russia	Visa required		
Rwanda	eVisa / Visa on arrival	30 days	
Saint Kitts and Nevis	eVisa		With a printed approval visitors are issued a visa on arrival by an Immigration Officer for a fee of 100 USD. The maximum length of stay is 30 days.
Saint Lucia	Visa required		
Saint Vincent and the Grenadines	Visa not required	3 months	
Samoa	Entry permit on arrival	90 days	
San Marino	Visa required		Same rules as for Italy. No border control but accessible only via Italy.
São Tomé and Príncipe	eVisa		
Saudi Arabia	Visa required		Visitors with a tourist or business visa issued by United States, United Kingdom or a Schengen member state traveling as tourists can obtain a visa on arrival for a maximum stay of 90 days. The visa must have been used at least once and should have an entry stamp of the issuing country. Passengers are allowed a total stay of 90 days within a period of 12 months. Visa fee must be paid by credit card.; First-degree family members of visitors with a tourist or business visa issued by United States, United Kingdom or a Schengen member state traveling as tourists can obtain a visa on arrival for a maximum stay of 90 days. The visa must have been used at least once and should have an entry stamp of the issuing country. Passengers are allowed a total stay of 90 days within a period of 12 months. Visa fee must be paid by credit card.; First-degree family members of visitors with a permanent residence permit issued by the US, United Kingdom or an EU Member State, traveling as tourists, can obtain visa on arrival for a maximum stay of 90 days. Visa fee must be paid by credit card.
Senegal	Visa not required	90 days	
Serbia	eVisa	90 days	90 days within any 180-day period. Transfers allowed.; Visa not required for holders of multiple entry visa issued by the United Kingdom, the US or an EEA Member State for a maximum stay of 90 days. The maximum stay of 90 days is granted within a 6-month period.
Seychelles	Electronic Border System	3 months	Application can be submitted up to 30 days before travel.; Visitors must upload a reservation confirmation(s) for each visitor's location of stay in Seychelles.; Yellow fever vaccination certificate is required if coming from endemic countries.; Payment of the fee (EUR 10) by credit or debit card.; Valid for one journey only and it expires once exit the country.
Sierra Leone	eVisa / Visa on arrival	3 months / 30 days	It can be granted at any of the three major entry points into the country and these are: Freetown International Airport, Lungi; Jendema – the crossing point from Liberia into Sierra Leone; Gbalamuya – the crossing point from Guinea into Sierra Leone
Singapore	Visa required		
Slovakia	Visa required		
Slovenia	Visa required		
Solomon Islands	Visa required		Can obtain a visa on arrival if they have a pre-arranged visa approval.
Somalia	eVisa	30 days	All visitors must have an approved Electronic Visa (eTAS) before the start of their journey.
South Africa	Visa not required	90 days	
South Sudan	eVisa		Obtainable online 30 days single entry for 100 USD, 90 days multiple entry for 200 USD and 180 days multiple entry for 350 USD.; Printed visa authorization must be presented at the time of travel.
Spain	Visa required		
Sri Lanka	ETA / Visa on arrival	630 days	
Sudan	Visa required		Mandatory Police Registration for all nationalities is required within 24 hours of arrival
Suriname	Visa not required	90 days	An entrance fee of USD 50 or EUR 50 must be paid online prior to arrival.; Multiple entry e-Visa is also available.
Sweden	Visa required		
Switzerland	Visa required		
Syria	Visa not required		
Tajikistan	Visa not required (conditional) / eVisa	14 days / 60 days	Visa not required for citizens over the age of 55 and they can stay for up to 14 days.; e-Visa holders can enter through all border points.
Tanzania	eVisa / Visa on arrival	90 days	
Thailand	Visa on arrival	15 days	
Timor-Leste	Visa on arrival	30 days	
Togo	eVisa	15 days	
Tonga	Visa required		
Trinidad and Tobago	eVisa	90 days	Holders of a copy of a pre-arranged approval from immigration can obtain a Waiver of the Visa on arrival. Fee: TTD 400.
Turkey	Visa not required	90 days	A total of 90 days is granted within 180 days.
Turkmenistan	Visa required		10-day visa on arrival if holding a letter of invitation provided by a company registered in Turkmenistan with a prior approval from the Foreign Ministry. Visitors can apply to extend their stay for an additional 10 days.; When transiting between two non-bordering countries, visitors can obtain a Turkmenistan transit visa for a five-day stay. This must be applied for in advance at the Turkmenistan Embassy. Visitors must also submit copies of the visas for the country of entry into Turkmenistan and the country of departure from Turkmenistan. Visa fee is 20 USD.
Tuvalu	Visa on arrival	1 month	
Uganda	eVisa	3 months	
Ukraine	Visa required		
United Arab Emirates	Visa required		May apply using 'Smart service'.
United Kingdom and Crown dependencies	Visa required		
United States	Visa required		
Uruguay	Visa required		
Uzbekistan	eVisa	30 days	5-day visa-free transit at the international airports if holding a confirmed onward ticket for a flight to a third country.
Vanuatu	Visa not required	120 days	
Vatican City	Visa required		
Venezuela	eVisa		Introduction of Electronic Visa System for Tourist and Business Travelers.
Vietnam	eVisa		e-Visa is valid for 90 days and multiple entry.; Holders of an approval letter issued and stamped by the Vietnamese Immigration Department can obtain a visa on arrival for a maximum stay of 1 or 3 months at airports in Hanoi, Ho Chi Minh City or Da Nang, Phú Quốc without a visa for up to 30 days.
Yemen	Visa required		Yemen introduced an e-Visa system for visitors who meet certain eligibility requirements (group travel of 10 or more people, business trips, and transit etc.).
Zambia	eVisa	90 days	
Zimbabwe	eVisa	1 month	

== Dependent, Disputed, or Restricted territories ==
Unrecognized or partially recognized countries

Territory	Conditions of access	Notes
Abkhazia	Visa required	Tourists from all countries (except Georgia) can visit Abkhazia for a period not exceeding 24 hours as part of an organized tourist group.
Kosovo	Visa required	Not required if holding multiple entry C type Schengen visa; Do not need a visa a holder of a valid biometric residence permit issued by one of the Schengen member states or a valid multi-entry Schengen Visa, a holder of a valid Laissez-Passer issued by United Nations Organizations, NATO, OSCE, Council of Europe or European Union a holder of a valid travel documents issued by EU Member and Schengen States, United States of America, Canada, Australia and Japan based on the 1951 Convention on Refugee Status or the 1954 Convention on the Status of Stateless Persons, as well as holders of valid travel documents for foreigners (maximum 15-day stay)
Northern Cyprus	Visa not required	
Palestine	Visa required	Israel's permission is required for West Bank.
Sahrawi Arab Democratic Republic	Visa regime undefined	Undefined visa regime in the Western Sahara controlled territory.
Somaliland	Visa on arrival	30 days for 30 USDs, payable on arrival.
South Ossetia	Visa required	To enter South Ossetia, visitors must have a multiple-entry visa for Russia and register their stay with the Migration Service of the Ministry of Internal Affairs within 3 days.
Taiwan	Visa required	
Transnistria	Visa not required	Visitors must complete and obtain a temporary migration card at the border checkpoint. The maximum period of stay is 45 days, and it can be extended multiple times through this card.

Dependent and autonomous territories

Territory	Conditions of access	Notes
China
Hong Kong	Visa not required	30 days
Macau	Visa on arrival	
Denmark
Faroe Islands	Visa required	
Greenland	Visa required	
Ecuador
Galápagos	Pre-registration required	60 days; Visitors must pre-register to receive a 20 USD Transit Control Card (TCT).
France
French Guiana	Visa required	
French Polynesia	Visa required	
(France) French West Indies	Visa required	Includes overseas departments of Guadeloupe and Martinique and overseas collectivities of Saint Barthélemy and Saint Martin.
Mayotte	Visa required	
New Caledonia	Visa required	
Réunion	Visa required	
Saint Pierre and Miquelon	Visa required	
Wallis and Futuna	Visa required	
Netherlands
Aruba	Visa required	
Caribbean Netherlands	Visa required	Includes Bonaire, Sint Eustatius and Saba.
Curaçao	Visa required	
Sint Maarten	Visa required	
New Zealand
Cook Islands	Visa not required	31 days
Niue	Visa not required	30 days
Tokelau	Visa required	
United Kingdom
Akrotiri and Dhekelia	Visa required	
Anguilla	eVisa	Holders of a valid visa issued by the United Kingdom do not require a visa.
Bermuda	Visa required	Visa-free for a maximum stay of 3 months if transiting through the United Kingdom.
British Indian Ocean Territory	Special permit required	Special permit required.
British Virgin Islands	Visa not required	
Cayman Islands	Visa required	
Falkland Islands	Visa required	
Gibraltar	Visa required	
Montserrat	eVisa	
Pitcairn Islands	Visa not required	14 days visa free and landing fee 35 USD or tax of 5 USD if not going ashore.
Ascension Island	eVisa	3 months within any year period.
Saint Helena	eVisa	
Tristan da Cunha	Permission required	Permission to land required for 15/30 pounds sterling (yacht/ship passenger) for Tristan da Cunha Island or 20 pounds sterling for Gough Island, Inaccessible Island or Nightingale Islands.
South Georgia and the South Sandwich Islands	Permit required	Pre-arrival permit from the Commissioner required (72 hours/1 month for 110/160 pounds sterling).
Turks and Caicos Islands	Visa required	Holders of a valid visa issued by Canada, the United Kingdom or US do not require a visa for a maximum stay of 90 days.
United States
American Samoa	Visa required	
Guam	Visa required	
Northern Mariana Islands	Visa required	
Puerto Rico	Visa required	
U.S. Virgin Islands	Visa required	
Antarctica and adjacent islands
Special permits required for Bouvet Island, British Antarctic Territory, French Southern and Antarctic Lands, Argentine Antarctica, (Australia) Australian Antarctic Territory, (Antártica Chilena Province) Chilean Antarctic Territory, (Australia) Heard Island and McDonald Islands, (Norway) Peter I Island, (Norway) Queen Maud Land, (New Zealand) Ross Dependency.

== See also ==
- Visa policy of Tunisia
- Tunisian passport
