= Tunisian nationality law =

Tunisian nationality code

National Assembly of Tunisia
- Long title: Décret-Loi no. 63-6 du 28 février 1963 portant refonte du Code de la nationalité tunisienne, ratifié par la Loi no. 637 du 22 avril 1963 (modifiée par la loi no. 7112 du 9 mars 1971, la loi no. 75-79 du 14 novembre 1979, la loi no. 84-81 du 30 novembre 1984, la loi no. 2002-4 du 21 janvier 2002, et la loi no. 2010-55 du 1 décembre 2010)
- Enacted by: Government of Tunisia
- Status: Current legislation

Tunisian nationality law (Arabic: مجلة الجنسية التونسية; French: Code de la nationalité tunisienne) is regulated by the Constitution of Tunisia, as amended; the Tunisian Nationality Code, and its revisions; and various international agreements to which the country is a signatory. These laws determine who is, or is eligible to be, a national of Tunisia. The legal means to acquire nationality, formal legal membership in a nation, differ from the domestic relationship of rights and obligations between a national and the nation, known as citizenship. Nationality describes the relationship of an individual to the state under international law, whereas citizenship is the domestic relationship of an individual within the nation. Tunisian nationality is typically obtained under the principal of jus sanguinis, i.e. by birth in Tunisia or abroad to parents with Tunisian nationality. It can be granted to persons with an affiliation to the country, or to a permanent resident who has lived in the country for a given period of time through naturalization.

== Acquisition of nationality ==
Nationality can be acquired in Tunisia at birth or later in life through naturalization.

=== By birth ===
Those who acquire nationality at birth include:

- Children born in Tunisia who have a father and paternal grandfather also born in Tunisia;
- Children born anywhere to a Tunisian father or mother acquire nationality automatically;
- Children born in Tunisia with unknown nationality or who would be otherwise stateless; or
- Foundlings or orphans, whose parents are unknown.

=== By naturalization ===
Naturalization can be granted to persons who have resided in the territory for a sufficient period of time to confirm they understand Arabic, the customs and traditions of Tunisia, and are integrated into the society. General provisions are that applicants have good character and morals; have no criminal convictions which resulted in sentencing in excess of one year; are in sufficient mental and physical health to avoid becoming a dependent of the state; and have a principal interest in the development of Tunisia. Applicants must typically have resided in the country for five years. Besides foreigners meeting the criteria, other persons who may be naturalized include:

- Children legally adopted by a Tunisian parent automatically acquire nationality at the time of completion of a legal adoption;
- Children can be automatically naturalized when their father acquires nationality, or if their mother is a widow and becomes naturalized;
- Persons born in Tunisia may opt for nationality without completing a residency requirement;
- The wife of a Tunisian national upon marriage may acquire Tunisian nationality after a two-year residency, or immediately if she is or will become stateless because of the marriage; or
- Persons who have performed exceptional service to the nation may naturalize without a residency period.

== Loss of nationality ==
Tunisian nationals may not renounce their nationality. There is a conflict of laws since passage of the 2014 Constitution which in Article 25 states that no Tunisian can be deprived of their nationality, exiled, extradited, or prevented from returning to Tunisia. (French: "Il est interdit de déchoir de sa nationalité tunisienne tout citoyen, de l’exiler, de l’extrader ou de l’empêcher de retourner dans son pays".) Terms of the Nationality Code provide that persons may be denaturalized in Tunisia for working for a foreign state or military without permission of Tunisian authorities; disloyalty to the state; committing crimes against the state or state security; for ordinary serious crimes; or for fraud, misrepresentation, or concealment in a naturalization petition. Naturalized persons may also lose their nationality for failure to complete military service in Tunisia.

== Dual nationality ==
Tunisian law has allowed dual nationality in most cases since 1975. Dual nationality is forbidden for the President of Tunisia.

== History ==
The earliest populations known in the territory of what is now Tunisia were Berber peoples. Though various empires, including Phoenicia, Rome, and Byzantium incorporated their territory, the Berbers refused to assimilate with these outside rulers. In the seventh century, Arabs began a conquest of the area, bringing Islam to the region. Though initially opposing and revolting against Arab rule, the Berbers over several centuries began to integrate into Arab society. From the middle of the eighth century the duty and responsibility of the caliph, or figure of authority, was to provide care and protection to his subjects (raʿāyā), who were his dependents and paid taxes. From 800 to 909 AD, the Aghlabid Dynasty consolidated rule over the territory which they called Ifriqiya and established the Trans-Saharan trade routes in the area. The Aghlabids were overthrown by the Fatimid Caliphate and its Berber allies in 909. The Fatimid capital was relocated to Egypt in 973, leaving Ifriqiya in charge of its vassal state ruled by the Zirid dynasty.

The Zirid-Fatimid relationship broke in 1049, but with the help of Arab Bedouins the Fatimid defeated the Zirid forces and restored the vassalage. In 1087 Mahdia was occupied by Italian mariners from Genoa and Pisa, and in 1148, was taken by Norman troops. The Normans were ousted in 1159 by the Almohad Caliphate, which also overthrew the Zirid dynasty in the twelfth century. The Almohads established Tunis as their capital of Ifriqiya and in 1207, assigned the governorship of Ifriqiya to the Abu Muhammad Abd al-Wahid ibn Abi Hafs, founder of the Hafsid dynasty. After administrating the territory for the Almohads for over two decades, in 1229, the dynasty proclaimed its independence and would remain in power for the next three centuries.

=== Spanish and Ottoman conflicts (1492–1574) ===
After Spain completed the centuries-long reconquista of taking back the Iberian Peninsula from Muslim rule, a plan was formulated to establish a series of presidios in ports along the North African coast. In 1495, Jerónimo Vianello (aka Gerónimo Vianelli), a Venetian mariner, was sent to evaluate the possibilities for capturing sites on the African coast. Muslim states in North Africa, facing the possibility of Christian invasion appealed to the Ottoman Empire to intervene. The emperor, busy trying to quell Cem's rebellion, authorized sea ghazis to come to their aid. Between 1505 and 1510, Spain captured and occupied Mers-el-Kebir, Oran, Tripoli, and Bougie, and made treaties for trading with other ports, such as Algiers. Increasingly, the Hafsids found themselves caught between the Ottoman and Spanish rivalry. In 1534, the Ottomans captured Tunis and were able to hold it for a year, before a combined force of Hafsids and Spanish recaptured the city. In return, the Hafsid dynasty became a vassal of Spain. The Ottoman forces retook Tunis in 1569, but it was freed by Spain in 1573, before finally being conquered by the Ottomans in 1574 and ending the Hafsid rule and Spanish claims to the area.

=== Ottoman rule (1574–1881) ===
In 1574, with the defeat of the Hafsid dynasty, 4,000 Janissary, military forces, were left in Tunis to assist in governance of Ottoman Tunisia. Establishing suzerainty over the area, the Sublime Porte appointed a pasha (governor) assisted by a bey, internal administrator and tax collector, and who consulted in governing with a divan (council) made up of local dignitaries and army officers. After a revolt by the Janissary in 1591, the pasha was forced by military officers, known as deys, to establish military rule. Having disbanded the divan, the deys laid the foundation for dynastic rule and within a few decades, their power was eclipsed by the bey, with the creation of the Muradid dynasty (1613–1705) which was followed by the Husainid dynasty and remained in power until 1957.

Within the Ottoman Empire (1299–1922) for six centuries, there was an internal organization that defined government functions for subjects by balancing religious and communal ties, weighing aptitudes and occupations without a centralized national ideology. Ottoman subjecthood was strongly tied to religion and non-Muslims, if they were ahl al-Kitāb (People of the Book), meaning Jewish, Christian, or Zoroastrian, could benefit from being subjects by agreeing to pay a tax to the sultan. Under a pact known as zimma, in exchange for paying taxes, the sultan allowed these subjects freedom of religion and guaranteed their lives, property, and rights with an understanding that they were legally entitled to less status than Muslim subjects. The pact was agreed to by the leaders of the confessional community, who managed the adherents and their internal organization under the religious law of their community.

By the eighteenth century a political organization, known as the millet, managed the affairs of their respective religious communities and developed into the protégé system (Turkish: beratlılar, protected persons). Signing treaties with European powers, from the 1673 signing of a Capitulation with France, the Ottoman Empire granted France control of certain Ottoman Christians, Austria control of some Ottoman Roman Catholics, most favoured nation status to British and Dutch traders, as well as specific rights to the Republic of Venice and Russian Empire. Under the terms of these treaties, foreign powers could recruit Ottoman subjects to serve their needs as commercial agents, consuls, or interpreters, and extend to these protégés diplomatic immunity from prosecution and privileges of trade, including lowered customs tariffs. Over time, abuses of the system led to a virtual monopoly of foreign trade by protégés, clandestine sales of letters patent (Turkish: berats), and demands from foreign powers for protection to extend from individuals to entire communities. The influence on Ottoman subjects by European powers changed the perception of these minority groups in the empire, meaning that they were increasingly seen not as Ottoman subjects, but as resident aliens.

To curb the disruptive effects of Europeans in the empire, from 1806, the Ottoman government began sending communiques to the foreign embassies demanding compliance with the terms of their agreements. Failing to achieve success diplomatically, in 1839, the Ottoman government issued the Edict of Gülhane, in an effort to end bribery and corruption, and to create fair tax schemes and institutions to protect the basic rights of Ottoman subjects. The Ottoman Reform Edict of 1856 (Turkish: Islâhat Fermânı) categorized subjects by whether they were Muslim or non-Muslim, granting different civil statuses to each, but establishing the principal of equality under the law. In 1857, after the Tunisian bey had executed a Jewish man for blasphemy, pressure from British and French diplomats led to enactment of the "Pact of Security" (ʿahd al-amān, or pacte fondamental) on 10 September. Though not a full constitution, or bill of rights, it contained eleven principles for due process and equal protection for foreigners in the areas of commerce, criminal prosecution, military service, property rights, religious freedom, and taxation. The Pact made clear that it was between the bey and his subjects and made no mention of Ottoman sovereignty.

On 26 April 1861, the Tunisian bey promulgated a full constitution, known as the Law of the Tunisian State (Qānūn al-dawla al-tūnisiyya). Laying out an executive and legislative system, it established the principles for regulating society on the basis of law. Granting the head of state traditional monarchical powers, it provided that the bey was owed the loyalty of his subjects as long as he ruled following the principles enshrined in law. Although the constitution did not specifically state how one acquired Tunisian nationality, it did provide in Article 92 that even if a Tunisian left the country and acquired another nationality, upon return to Tunisia, they would be again Tunisian. This did not mean that a subject could voluntarily renounce Tunisian nationality, as the government interpretation was that expatriation was not allowed, because under Islamic law allegiance was perpetual. Article 94 also provided that Tunisian nationality was not reliant upon religion, thus conversion would not change whether or not a subject was Tunisian. In 1863, new Ottoman regulations upon protégés restricted the privileges they received in the empire and clarifying who were thereafter considered to be Ottoman subjects and who were foreigners. In 1864, civil unrest in Tunisia resulted in the suspension of the constitution.

To further define subjects of the Ottoman Empire, new nationality legislation was passed in 1869 (tâbiiyet-i osmaniye kanunnamesi, Ottoman Nationality Law). (Note: Will Hanley, a history professor at Florida State University, notes that the etymology of tâbiiyet includes associations with allegiance, nationality, and subjecthood, or an affiliation to a sovereign, but does not translate as citizenship.) The law specified terms for the acquisition and loss of who was within the sovereignty of the empire, rather than the domestic obligations and rights of citizenship. It described who was a subject, owing allegiance, and made provisions for wives, children, emigrants and immigrants. Under its terms, children derived nationality from their fathers, foreigners born in the territory could acquire nationality at majority, and foreigners born elsewhere could obtain nationality after five years residency within the imperial realm. Specific provisions included that foundlings discovered within the territory; stateless persons living in the empire; Muslim women, who despite the ban on such marriages, had married Persian men and the children of such a union; unregistered persons who had not been counted in the Ottoman census, either because no census was taken or their births were unregistered, were all considered to be Ottoman. Foreign women acquired Ottoman nationality through marriage, but could return to their original nationality upon the death of their spouse. Nationality could also be granted based on special contribution or service to the nation. Dual nationality was permitted, but was discouraged, as the government could choose not to recognize naturalization of an Ottoman subject by another state. (Note: The situation of Tunisian nationals was complicated in the developing field of international law. Despite being a semi-autonomous province of the Ottoman empire, courts called to settle legal disputes of multi-nationals, as in the case of Nassim Shamama, had to determine which laws were applicable. The case was important in the development of private law because in the period the centrality of nationality to international law and legal identity was just developing. While it was clear that nationals within their own country were subject to national law, it was less clear what law should be followed for nationals who were abroad. Also unclear was whether religious affiliation and religious law as an ideology of nationalism through united culture, as opposed to sovereign territorial boundaries established legal nationhood. Between 1851 and 1873, debate ensued between politicians and scholars, with many countries adopting policies that nationality, rather than territorial boundaries or ethnicity should regulate applicable laws. In 1873, the Institute of International Law was founded to create cooperation among those involved in the field for the development of international law.)

A gradual economic downturn fueled by the curtailment of corsair raiding because of pressure from European merchants, led eventually to the bankruptcy of the country in 1869. An international financial commission, established to oversee the finances led to disagreements with European powers over how policy should be implemented. Despite protest from the Ottoman Empire that the Europeans were ignoring their authority in Tunisia, rivals Britain, France, and Italy made agreements directly with the Tunisian bey, each striving for control of the area. France persuaded Germany and Britain to accept its establishment of a protectorate over Tunisia at the 1878 Congress of Berlin. The rivalry with Italy continued until 1881, when France crossed into the country from neighboring Algeria and began its occupation under the guise of assisting the bey in quelling internal rebellion.

=== French protectorate (1881–1956) ===
On 12 May 1881, a French protectorate was extended over Tunisia by the terms of the Treaty of Bardo. The treaty provided that in exchange for providing protection for the bey and his dynasty, France would occupy the areas necessary to bring order and security to the territory. The treaty specifically recognized the Capitulation agreements which gave other nations extraterritorial authority over their subjects in Tunisia. Recognizing the destabilizing effect of granting other powers authority to act in civilian matters in the territory, in 1883 under the terms of the Conventions of La Marsa, France agreed to pay off the debts of the country, abolishing the need for the financial commission, in exchange for the ability to enact administrative reform. In effect, the agreement allowed the bey to continue to reign but removed his authority to rule. France began negotiating with states to cede their authority under the Capitulations with the promise that France would provide legal protection for all foreigners and Europeans in the jurisdiction, while the natives would be protected by the local legal system.

To accomplish protection, the French declared anyone in Tunisia who was not a native Tunisian was subject to French law. By 1910, natives who wished to avoid either adhering to local laws or French legal norms, used jurisdictional politics to claim nationality by birth in territories controlled by other European powers. To regain their authority, France began devising a scheme to confer nationality upon all European subjects in Tunisia and define nationality for the subjects of the bey. On 19 June 1914, the bey issued a decree defining Tunisians as anyone residing within its territory before or after the decree was issued, who was not a French or foreign national or subject, and anyone who was born anywhere to a Tunisian father, or a Tunisian mother, if the father was not known. (Note: Mary D. Lewis, a professor of French history at Harvard University noted that the inclusion of both national and subject in the decree was intentional. Subject was included to allow natives from Libya who had arrived in Tunisia prior to 28 October 1912, the date France recognized Italy's sovereignty over Libya, to acquire Tunisian nationality.) Following the end of World War I France passed a law on 25 March 1915 that allowed subjects or protected persons who were non-citizen nationals of Algeria, Morocco, or Tunisia and who had established domicile in a French territory to acquire full French citizenship, including the naturalization of their wives and minor children, by having received the cross of the Legion of Honor, having obtained a university degree, having rendered service to the nation, having attained the rank of an officer or received a medal from the French army, who had married a Frenchwoman and established a one-year residency; or who had resided for more than ten years in a French colony other than their country of origin.

The final stage in abolishing the Capitulation System was to adopt a parallel legal system (législations parallèles), similar to what France had adopted in Morocco, basically issuing decrees on the same day applying to those governed under French law and those governed according to local jurisdiction. On 8 November 1921, the bey issued a decree that anyone born in Tunisia whose parent was also born in Tunisia and who was not a citizen, subject, or national of "the protecting power" was Tunisian. France simultaneously issued a decree proclaiming that those who were born in Tunisia to a parent born in Tunisia who were subject to French legal jurisdiction in the protectorate were French. (Note: In 1922, Britain challenged France's ability to confer French nationality on its subjects with the League of Nations and the matter was referred to the International Court of Justice in The Hague. The court advised that based upon treaties, France did not have the right to impose its nationality on British subjects. Based on that decision, diplomats came to an agreement in the Anglo-French Convention of 1923 that British nationals in Tunisia could choose to obtain French nationality, but that their offspring born in Tunisia after 1921 would be French nationals. Because of the terms of an 1896 treaty with Italy, Italian nationals in Tunis were exempt from French nationality until a new agreement between France and Italy was promulgated in 1935.) A French decree issued in 1923 maintained that those born in Tunisia who were not Tunisians under the 1921 law were French, but provided an option that any child who had acquired French nationality from birth in Tunisia to a parent also born there could renounce their French nationality, unless their parent had become French under the same rule. The 1923 Decree also provided that a person who renounced their French nationality had to prove that they had obtained other nationality; that foreigners who had reached majority and had resided continuously in Tunisia for three years could naturalize as French; that Tunisians could become French nationals after having completed military service, having earned higher education certificates or degrees, having married a French woman, or having performed service of benefit to France; and that a woman whose husband naturalized as French was automatically French, as was a woman who married a French national.

From 1920, Tunisians pressed for a constitutional government and in the 1930s supported nationalist movements across Africa. In 1942, Germany occupied both France and Tunisia, and renewed opposition to Tunisia's status as a protectorate began. Refusing to side with Germany, the bey appointed a new Tunisian government from across the political spectrum of prominent Tunisians, ignoring the French settler population. Ousted from power by the Free French, operating from Algeria, the bey abdicated in favor of his cousin, but the nationalist movement continued. After World War II ended and the French returned to power, Tunisians joined with Algerian and Moroccan nationalists in 1947 to found the Bureau du Maghreb Aribe. The following year, they formed the Comité de Libération d’Afrique du Nord. In 1949, when the United Nations backed independence for Libya, Tunisian nationalists became even more insistent on Tunisians being given meaningful power to govern. Despite the pressure, French administrators were unwilling to carry out broad reforms and insisted on continued co-sovereignty. By 1954, the nationalist movement had turned militant and begun a guerrilla campaign against the French. In 1955, the French agreed to grant internal autonomy to Tunisia and full independence the following year.

=== Post-independence (1956–present) ===
On 26 January 1956, Tunisia adopted a Nationality Code (Order 2/1956) and on 20 March 1956, gained its independence. The 1956 code provided that nationality was transmitted to a child through its father unless the father was unknown, had unknown nationality, or was stateless. Children who were born to a Tunisian mother had an option to acquire her nationality upon reaching majority. Upon marriage, a wife acquired nationality through her husband. Tunisia became a republic and promulgated a new constitution in 1959. It adopted a new law on Tunisian nationality on 28 February 1963 (Decrét-Loi 6/1963), which was converted in April (Loi No. 63-7) to the Tunisian Nationality Code. The 1963 Code allowed a child born in Tunisia to acquire nationality through either parent, but limited nationality for children born abroad to those with Tunisian fathers, unless the mother was Tunisian and the father was a foreigner. An administrative reform in 1971 (Loi No.71-12) established procedures for delivery of a certificate of nationality; an amendment in 1975 (Loi 75–79) allowed dual nationality, unless foreign nationality was acquired after naturalization, in which case it could lead to loss of Tunisian nationality; and an amendment of 1984 (Law 84-84) made serving in the government or military of a foreign state grounds for denaturalization.

The Nationality Code was amended again in 1993 (Loi 93–62) to allow a child born abroad to a Tunisian mother and foreign father to acquire nationality either by its own declaration at majority or by a joint declaration of its parents while in its minority. This provision was modified in 2002 (Loi 2002–4) to stipulate that if the father was absent, deceased or legally incapacitated, the declaration of the mother alone was sufficient to confer nationality to a child born abroad. In 1997, a new Tunisian Constitution established equality between men and women, but the nationality code retained discrimination in the procedures to acquire nationality. The amendment of 2010 (Loi 2010–55) eliminated discriminatory requirements in acquiring nationality after its effective date for children born to a Tunisian mother in the same way that they could from a Tunisian father. Bronwen Manby, an expert on African nationality law, has noted that jus soli provisions Tunisia still apply only to children who have a father and paternal grandfather also born in Tunisia and that Tunisian women cannot transmit their nationality to their husbands. Though Tunisia removed its reservations to the Convention on the Elimination of All Forms of Discrimination Against Women in 2014, Article 16 provides that if a marriage with a Tunisian husband is annulled the wife loses her nationality, regardless of whether she can repatriate to her former nationality or will become stateless.
