= Visa requirements for Saudi citizens =

Requirements for citizens of Saudi Arabia travelling internationally

A recent Saudi passport with biometric chip

Visa requirements for Saudi citizens are administrative entry restrictions by the authorities of other states placed on citizens of Saudi Arabia.

As of 2026, Saudi citizens have visa-free or visa on arrival access to 91 countries and territories, ranking the Saudi passport 50th in the world, according to the Henley Passport Index.

Saudi citizens do not need a visa to enter other Gulf Cooperation Council (GCC) countries and also have the right to work in those countries. Similarly, citizens of other GCC states do not need a visa to enter Saudi Arabia. GCC citizens can use a GCC national identity card (rather than a passport) to enter Saudi Arabia.

== History ==
Visa requirements for Saudi citizens were lifted by New Zealand (July 1999), Kyrgyzstan (July 2012), Honduras (September 2016), Georgia (November 2016), Belarus (February 2017), Barbados (May 2019), South Africa (August 2019), Kazakhstan (September 2019), Ukraine (August 2020), Uzbekistan (August 2022), Zambia (December 2022), Singapore (June 2023), Iran (December 2023), Turkey (January 2024), the United Kingdom (February 2024), Pakistan (September 2024), China (June 2025), Armenia (July 2025), Russia (11 May 2026).

Visas on arrival for Saudi citizens were introduced by Malawi in October 2015, followed by Azerbaijan in February 2016, followed by Gabon in October 2017, followed by Pakistan in March 2019.

Electronic Visas for Saudi citizens were introduced by Myanmar that commenced on 1 September 2014, followed by Djibouti on 18 February 2018, followed by India on 17 June 2019, followed by the United Kingdom on 1 June 2022, followed by Armenia on 5 July 2022, followed by Japan on 27 March 2023.

European Union is currently working on facilitating visa-free entry into Schengen Area for Saudi citizens.

Paraguay is working on opening an embassy in Riyadh and abolish visa requirements for Saudi citizens.

Colombia has officially launched negotiations on a visa exemption agreement for Saudi citizens.

== Visa requirements map ==
Visa requirements for Saudi citizens holding ordinary passports Saudi Arabia Freedom of movement Visa not required / Electronic Travel Authorisation Visa on arrival eVisa Visa available both on arrival or online Visa required

== Visa requirements ==
Country	Visa requirement	Allowed stay	Notes (excluding departure fees)
Afghanistan	eVisa	30 days	Due to safety concerns, the Government of Saudi Arabia advises citizens not to travel to Afghanistan for any reason.; e-Visa : Visitors must arrive at Kabul International (KBL).; Visitors may apply for an e-Visa in other countries, excluding some countries of residence (include Saudi Arabia).
Albania	Visa not required	90 days	
Algeria	Visa required		Persons may be denied entry if entering with a passport containing visas or stamps issued by Israel.; Visitors on tours organized to some southern regions by an approved travel agency may obtain a visa on arrival for up to 30 days.
Andorra	Visa required		
Angola	Visa not required	30 days	30 days per trip, but no more than 90 days within any 1 calendar year for tourism purposes only.; Visitors must have a return/onward ticket and a hotel reservation confirmation.; An International Certificate of Vaccination is required.
Antigua and Barbuda	eVisa		
Argentina	Visa required		The AVE (High Speed Travel) is open to Saudi citizens holding valid, current ordinary passports traveling to Argentina for tourism. To do so, they must hold a valid category B2/J/B1/O/P (P1-P2-P3)/E/H-1B visa issued by the United States of America.
Armenia	Visa not required	180 days	Visa exempt from 1 July 2025.
Australia	Online Visa required		May apply online (Online Visitor e600 visa).
Austria	Visa required		
Azerbaijan	Visa not required	30 days	Visitors may enter Azerbaijan without a visa from February 15, 2026, to February 15, 2027.
Bahamas	eVisa		
Bahrain	Freedom of movement	Freedom of Movement.; ID card valid.	
Bangladesh	Visa on arrival	30 days	
Barbados	Visa not required	90 days	
Belarus	Visa not required	30 days	Must arrive and leave via Minsk National Airport and not to/from Russia.
Belgium	Visa required		
Belize	Visa required		
Benin	eVisa	30 days	Must have an international vaccination certificate.; Three types of electronic visa are offered: the e-Visa valid for 30 days for a single entry (50 EUR), the e-Visa valid for 30 days for several (multiple) entries (75 EUR), and the e-Visa valid for 90 days to make several (multiple) entries (100 EUR).
Bhutan	eVisa	90 days	The Sustainable Development Fee (SDF) of 200 USD per person, per night for almost all visitors to Bhutan. Additionally, if payment is made in US dollars from September 1, 2023 to August 31, 2027, the SDF is 100 USD.
Bolivia	Online Visa		
Bosnia and Herzegovina	Visa not required		Valid multiple entry visa holders and residents of the European Union, Schengen Area member states and United States of America can enter Bosnia and Herzegovina without a visa for a maximum stay of 30 days.; Visa exemption from June 1 to September 30.
Botswana	Visa not required	90 days	
Brazil	Visa required		
Brunei	Visa on arrival	30 days	$20 BND Brunei Dollars only cash.
Bulgaria	Visa required		
Burkina Faso	eVisa		
Burundi	Online Visa / Visa on arrival	1 month	
Cambodia	eVisa / Visa on arrival	30 days	
Cameroon	eVisa		
Canada	Visa required		
Cape Verde	Visa on arrival (EASE)	30 days	Visa on arrival may applied for via the online platform (EASE) and issued at international airports in Sal, Boa Vista, São Vicente or Santiago. Visa fee is approximately 25–30 EUR.; Visitors must pay the Airport Security Fee (TSA) before visiting. The cost is 3,400 CVE (approx. 31 EUR) and can be paid via the online platform (EASE).
Central African Republic	Visa required		
Chad	eVisa		Due to safety concerns, the Government of Saudi Arabia advises citizens not to travel to Chad for any reason.
Chile	Visa required		
China	Visa not required	30 days	Visa-free From 9 June 2025, to 31 December 2026.; 24-hour visa-free transit through any international airports of China (except Ürümqi), allows domestic travel through different airports. (Note: Custom procedure for 24-hour visa-free transit is required in principle, except in Beijing (both Capital and Daxing), Shanghai Pudong, Hangzhou, Xiamen, Guangzhou, Shenzhen, Chengdu Tianfu and Xi'an if no leaving of international transit areas.)
Colombia	Online Visa		
Comoros	Visa on arrival	45 days	
Republic of the Congo	Visa required		
Democratic Republic of the Congo	eVisa	7 days	
Costa Rica	Visa required		90 days visa-free if hold a valid residence permit issued by the European Union member countries, Canada, Iceland, Norway, Switzerland, the United Kingdom or the United States and multiple-entry visa issued by Canada and the United States.
Côte d'Ivoire	eVisa	3 months	e-Visa holders must arrive at Abidjan airport.
Croatia	Visa required		
Cuba	eVisa	90 days	Can be extended up to 90 days with a fee.
Cyprus	Visa required		
Czech Republic	Visa required		
Denmark	Visa required		
Djibouti	eVisa	90 days	
Dominica	Visa not required	21 days	
Dominican Republic	Visa required		
Ecuador	Visa not required	90 days	
Egypt	Visa not required	6 months	
El Salvador	Visa not required	90 days	
Equatorial Guinea	eVisa		Must arrive via Malabo International Airport, processing fee 75 USD.
Eritrea	Visa required		
Estonia	Visa required		
Eswatini	Visa required		
Ethiopia	eVisa / Visa on arrival	90 days	e-Visa holders must arrive via Addis Ababa Bole International Airport.
Fiji	Online Visa		
Finland	Visa required		
France	Visa required		
Gabon	eVisa	90 days	e-Visa holders must arrive via Libreville International Airport.
Gambia	Visa required		
Georgia	Visa not required	1 year	
Germany	Visa required		
Ghana	Visa required		
Greece	Visa required		
Grenada	Visa required		
Guatemala	Visa not required	90 days	
Guinea	eVisa	90 days	
Guinea-Bissau	Visa on arrival	90 days	
Guyana	eVisa		
Haiti	Visa not required	90 days	Due to safety concerns, the Government of Saudi Arabia advises citizens not to travel to Haiti for any reason.
Honduras	Visa not required	90 days	
Hungary	Visa required		
Iceland	Visa required		
India	eVisa	30 days	US$119 For 30-day tourists visa online.; e-Visa holders must arrive via 32 designated airports (Note: Ahmedabad; Amritsar; Bagdogra; Bengaluru; Bhubaneswar; Chandigarh; Chennai; Coimbatore; Delhi; Gaya; Goa-Dabolim; Goa-Manohar; Guwahati; Hyderabad; Indore; Jaipur; Kannur; Kochi; Kolkata; Kozhikode; Lucknow; Madurai; Mangaluru; Mumbai; Nagpur; Port Blair; Pune; Surat; Thiruvananthapuram; Tiruchirappalli; Varanasi; Visakhapatnam) or 5 designated seaports. (Note: Chennai; Cochin; Mormugao; Mumbai; Mangalore); An Indian e-Tourist Visa may only be obtained twice within 1 calendar year.; Foreigners of Pakistani origin or who hold a Pakistani Passport are not eligible for an e-Visa. Foreigners who are not Pakistani nationals, but whose parents or grandparents (either paternal or maternal) were born in, or were permanent residents in Pakistan, are also not eligible for an e-Visa.
Indonesia	e-VOA / Visa on arrival	30 days	US$35 Or 500,000 IDR cash or credit card 509,950 IDR may accept Euros. 30 days but can be extendable. Will force passengers to book another flight leaving Indonesia before boarding.
Iran	Visa not required	15 Days	Due to safety concerns, the Government of Saudi Arabia advises citizens not to travel to Iran for any reason.
Iraq	eVisa	30 days	You can apply for an e-Visa (30 days) to visit the Iraqi Kurdistan Region.; Due to safety concerns, the Government of Saudi Arabia advises citizens not to travel to Iraq for any reason.
Ireland	Visa required		Visa not required if a passenger first enters the United Kingdom with a visitor visa issued by the United Kingdom. They are visa exempt for a maximum stay of 90 days in Ireland or until the end of the period of stay granted in the United Kingdom. This waiver cannot be used with a UK ETA.
Israel	Visa required		Confirmation from Israeli Foreign Ministry is required before a visa is issued.; Because the Government of Saudi Arabia does not recognize Israel, citizens are advised to not travel to Israel for any reason.
Italy	Visa required		
Jamaica	Visa required		
Japan	eVisa	90 days	
Jordan	Visa not required	90 days	
Kazakhstan	Visa not required	30 days	
Kenya	Electronic Travel Authorisation	90 days	Applications can be submitted up to 90 days prior to travel and must be submitted at least 3 days in advance.; eTA fee is 32.50 USD.; Proof of reservation at the hotel where visitors plan to stay is required (if staying with friends, an invitation letter is also acceptable).; Yellow fever vaccination certificate is required if coming from endemic countries.
Kiribati	Visa not required	90 days	90 days within any 12-month period.
North Korea	Visa required		Visitors traveling for tourist purposes must hold an authorization to travel, issued by a travel company in Korea (Dem. People's Rep.).
South Korea	Electronic Travel Authorization	30 days	All visitors are fingerprinted. From September 2021, travelers require the Korean Electronic Travel Authorization (K-ETA). The validity period is 3 years from the date of approval.; The government of the Republic of Korea announced that from 1 January 2026, to 31 December 2026, a K-ETA is not required for 27 countries citizens visiting Korea for 90 days or less for business or tourism.
Kuwait	Freedom of movement	Freedom of Movement.; ID card valid.	
Kyrgyzstan	Visa not required	30 days	30 days within any 60-day period.
Laos	eVisa / Visa on arrival	30 days	18 (Note: Savannakhet Airport; Lanetoui - Mengkang (China); Meuangmom - Wan Pong (Myanmar); Banvang - Ban Khok Phai (Thailand); Namngeun - Huay Kon (Thailand); Paksan - Bueng Kan (Thailand); Paktaphan - Pak Saeng (Thailand); Pangmon - Ban Huak (Thailand); Phoudou (Thailand); Dak ta ock - Nam Giang (Vietnam); La Lai (Vietnam); Namkan (Vietnam); Namphao - Cau Treo (Vietnam); Namsoy - Na Meo (Vietnam); Naphao - Cha Lo (Vietnam); Pahang - Long Sap (Vietnam); Panghok - Tây Trang (Vietnam); Phoukeua - Bo Y (Vietnam)) of the 33 border crossings are only open to regular visa holders.; e-Visa may be used to enter Laos through the Luang Prabang, Pakse and Vientiane international airports, 3 Thai-Lao Friendship Bridges (Note: Vientiane (Friendship Bridge 1); Savannakhet (Friendship Bridge 2); Bokeo (Friendship Bridge 4)), in Boten (road and railroad), and in Vientiane (at Khamsavath railway station).; Visa on arrival is available at the Luang Prabang, Pakse and Vientiane international airports, 4 Thai-Lao Friendship Bridges (Note: Vientiane (Friendship Bridge 1); Savannakhet (Friendship Bridge 2); Khammouane (Friendship Bridge 3); Bokeo (Friendship Bridge 4)) and 7 border crossings. (Note: Nongnokkheane - Trapeang Kriel (Cambodia); Boten - Bo han (China); Golden Triangle/Samliemkham (Thailand); Khamsavath railway station (Thailand); Namheuang - Ban Na Kraseng (Thailand); Vang tao - Chongmek (Thailand); Dansavan - Lao Bảo (Vietnam))
Latvia	Visa required		
Lebanon	Visa not required	6 months	
Lesotho	Visa required		
Liberia	Visa required		
Libya	eVisa	30 days	Due to safety concerns, the Government of Saudi Arabia advises citizens not to travel to Libya for any reason.
Liechtenstein	Visa required		
Lithuania	Visa required		
Luxembourg	Visa required		
Madagascar	eVisa / Visa on arrival	90 days	For stays of 61 to 90 days, the visa fee is US$59.
Malawi	eVisa / Visa on arrival	30 days	
Malaysia	Visa not required	90 days	
Maldives	Free visa on arrival	30 days	Can be extended.
Mali	Visa required		
Malta	Visa required		
Marshall Islands	Visa required		
Mauritania	eVisa	30 days	
Mauritius	Visa not required	180 days	180 days per calendar year for tourism, 120 days per calendar year for business.
Mexico	Visa required		May enter without a visa if obtaining a valid visa or a permanent residency to Canada, Japan, the United Kingdom, the United States, or the Schengen area.
Micronesia	Visa not required	30 days	
Moldova	eVisa		
Monaco	Visa required		
Mongolia	eVisa	30 days	
Montenegro	Visa required		
Morocco	Visa not required	90 days	
Mozambique	Visa not required	30 days	Visitors must register their ETA on the e-Visa platform at least 48 hours before travel and pay a processing fee of US$48.
Myanmar	eVisa	28 days	e-Visa holders must arrive via Yangon, Nay Pyi Taw or Mandalay airports or via land border crossings with Thailand — Tachileik, Myawaddy and Kawthaung or India — Rih Khaw Dar and Tamu.; e-Visa is available for tourism only.; Due to safety concerns, the Government of Saudi Arabia advises citizens not to travel to Myanmar for any reason.
Namibia	eVisa	3 months	
Nauru	Visa required		
Nepal	Online Visa / Visa on arrival	90 days	
Netherlands	Visa required		
New Zealand	Electronic Travel Authority	90 days	Use NZeTA app to scan passport, $52 NZD to process NZeTA.; International Visitor Conservation and Tourism Levy must be paid upon requesting an Electronic Travel Authority.; Holders of an Australian Permanent Resident Visa or Resident Return Visa may be granted a New Zealand Resident Visa on arrival permitting indefinite stay (pursuant to the Trans-Tasman Travel Arrangement), subject to meeting character requirements and obtaining an Electronic Travel Authority prior to departure. Such travellers are not required to pay the International Visitor Conservation and Tourism Levy.
Nicaragua	Visa not required	90 days	
Niger	Visa required		
Nigeria	eVisa	30 days	
North Macedonia	Visa required		
Norway	Visa required		
Oman	Freedom of movement	Freedom of Movement.; ID card valid.	
Pakistan	Visa not required	90 days	
Palau	Free visa on arrival	30 days	
Panama	Visa not required	90 days	
Papua New Guinea	eVisa	60 days	Visitors may apply for a visa online under the "Tourist - Own Itinerary" category.
Paraguay	Visa required		
Peru	Visa required		
Philippines	Visa not required	30 days	
Poland	Visa required		
Portugal	Visa required		
Qatar	Freedom of movement	Freedom of Movement.; ID card valid.	
Romania	Visa required		
Russia	Visa not required	90 days	90 days within one calendar year period.
Rwanda	eVisa / Visa on arrival	30 days	
Saint Kitts and Nevis	Electronic Travel Authorisation	90 days	
Saint Lucia	Visa required		
Saint Vincent and the Grenadines	Visa not required	3 months	
Samoa	Entry permit on arrival	90 days	
San Marino	Visa required		
São Tomé and Príncipe	eVisa		
Senegal	Visa required		
Serbia	eVisa	90 days	90 days within any 180-day period. Transfers allowed.; 90 days visa-free if holding a valid visa or permanent residence of the Cyprus, Ireland, Schengen Area member states, United Kingdom or the United States may enter Serbia without a visa for a maximum stay of 90 days within any 180-day period.
Seychelles	Electronic Border System	90 days	Application can be submitted up to 30 days before travel.; Visitors must upload a reservation confirmation(s) for each visitor's location of stay in Seychelles.; Yellow fever vaccination certificate is required if coming from endemic countries.; Payment of the fee (EUR 10) by credit or debit card.; Valid for one journey only and it expires once exit the country.
Sierra Leone	eVisa / Visa on arrival	3 months / 30 days	
Singapore	Visa not required		Maximum stay at discretion of local immigration officers.
Slovakia	Visa required		
Slovenia	Visa required		
Solomon Islands	Visa required		
Somalia	eVisa	30 days	
South Africa	Visa not required	90 days	e-Visa holders must arrive via O. R. Tambo International Airport.
South Sudan	eVisa		Obtainable online 30 days single entry for 100 USD, 90 days multiple entry for 200 USD and 180 days multiple entry for 350 USD.; Printed visa authorization must be presented at the time of travel.; Due to safety concerns, the Government of Saudi Arabia advises citizens not to ravel to South Sudan for any reason.
Spain	Visa required		
Sri Lanka	ETA / Visa on arrival	30 days	30 days extendable to 6 months.; The standard visitor visa allows a stay of 60 days within any 6-month period.; Visa fees (for Standard visitor visa): SAARC - USD 35; Non SAARC - USD 75
Sudan	Visa required		Visa-free for business visits.; Due to safety concerns, the Government of Saudi Arabia advises citizens not to travel to Sudan for any reason.
Suriname	Visa not required	90 days	An entrance fee of USD 50 or EUR 50 must be paid online prior to arrival.; Multiple entry e-Visa is also available.
Sweden	Visa required		
Switzerland	Visa required		
Syria	eVisa / Visa on arrival		Due to safety concerns, the Government of Saudi Arabia advises citizens not to travel to Syria for any reason.
Tajikistan	Visa not required / eVisa	30 days / 60 days	e-Visa also available.; e-Visa holders can enter through all border points.
Tanzania	eVisa / Visa on arrival	90 days	
Thailand	Visa not required	60 days	
Timor-Leste	Visa on arrival	30 days	
Togo	eVisa	15 days	
Tonga	Visa required		
Trinidad and Tobago	eVisa		
Tunisia	Visa not required	90 days	
Turkey	Visa not required	90 days	90 days within any 180-day period.
Turkmenistan	Visa required		10-day visa on arrival if holding a letter of invitation provided by a company registered in Turkmenistan with a prior approval from the Foreign Ministry. Visitors can apply to extend their stay for an additional 10 days.; When transiting between two non-bordering countries, visitors can obtain a Turkmenistan transit visa for a five-day stay. This must be applied for in advance at the Turkmenistan Embassy. Visitors must also submit copies of the visas for the country of entry into Turkmenistan and the country of departure from Turkmenistan. Visa fee is 20 USD.
Tuvalu	Visa on arrival	1 month	
Uganda	eVisa	3 months	
Ukraine	Visa not required	90 days	90 days within any 180-day period.
United Arab Emirates	Freedom of movement	Freedom of Movement.; ID card valid.	
United Kingdom	Electronic Travel Authorisation	6 months	Authorisation lasts up to 2 years, with multiple entries permitted.
United States	Visa required		
Uruguay	Visa required		
Uzbekistan	Visa not required	30 days	You must have or book a flight within 30 days leaving Uzbekistan, train or bus tickets are not enough to be allowed going through immigration and go outside airports.
Vanuatu	Visa not required	120 days	
Vatican City	Visa required		
Venezuela	eVisa		Due to safety concerns, the Government of Saudi Arabia advises citizens not to travel to Venezuela for any reason.; Introduction of Electronic Visa System for Tourist and Business Travelers.
Vietnam	eVisa		e-Visa is valid for 90 days and multiple entry. Options 1 month single (25 USD) or multiple entries or 3 months single or multiple entries.
Yemen	Visa on arrival	90 days	Due to safety concerns, the Government of Saudi Arabia advises citizens not to travel to Yemen for any reason.; Separately, Yemen introduced an e-Visa system for visitors who meet certain eligibility requirements (group travel of 10 or more people, business trips, and transit etc.).
Zambia	Visa not required	30 days	
Zimbabwe	eVisa	1 month	

== Dependent, disputed, or restricted territories ==
Unrecognized or partially recognized countries

Territory	Conditions of access	Notes
Abkhazia	Visa required	Tourists from all countries (except Georgia) can visit Abkhazia for a period not exceeding 24 hours as part of an organized tourist group.
Kosovo	Visa not required	90 days
Northern Cyprus	Visa not required	90 days
Palestine	Visa not required	
Somaliland	visa on arrival	30 days; Visa on arrival is not available at land or seaports, visa in advance is then required.
South Ossetia	Visa required	To enter South Ossetia, visitors must have a multiple-entry visa for Russia and register their stay with the Migration Service of the Ministry of Internal Affairs within 3 days.
Taiwan	eVisa	30 days; Apply online 30-day visit e-Visa before arrival, not extendable.

Dependent and autonomous territories

Territory	Conditions of access	Notes
China
Hong Kong	Visa not required	90 days
Macau	Visa not required	30 days
Ecuador
Galápagos	Pre-registration required	60 days; Visitors must pre-register to receive a 20 USD Transit Control Card (TCT).

== See also ==
- Visa policy of Saudi Arabia
