= Illegal immigration to Saudi Arabia =

Mecca has mandated a six-year cap on the residency of foreigners in the country, as part of its programme to control the local job market, and any Hajji or illegal overstayers are met with a mandatory prison sentence followed by swift deportation. Many illegal immigrants are those who have overstayed their visit, employment or Hajj visas, although there are many who sneak into the country without border staff noticing.

However, some nationalities don't need a visa to enter the country, which include the members of the Gulf Cooperation Council (GCC), for instance. Furthermore, there are many stateless people (known as Bidoon in Saudi Arabia) who live there.

== See also ==
- Saudization
- Saudi–Yemen barrier
- Visa policy of Saudi Arabia
