= Saudi nationality law =

Saudi Arabian Citizenship Act

Parliament of Saudi Arabia
- Long title: An Act relating to Saudi Arabian citizenship
- Enacted by: Government of Saudi Arabia
- Status: Current legislation

Saudi nationality law, officially called the Saudi Arabian Citizenship System, is the law that determines who is a Saudi citizen.

== By blood ==
Children born to a Saudi father or an unknown or stateless father and Saudi mother could be a Saudi citizen if the conditions are satisfied.

== By marriage ==
A foreign woman who marries a Saudi man has the right to citizenship, provided that she gives up her foreign citizenship. Saudi women who give up citizenship upon marriage to a foreign husband (the marriage should complete 10 years and should have three children) has the right to take up Saudi citizenship if she divorces or returns to Saudi Arabia. One can only apply for citizenship if he is mature. Additional conditions are in place before the government will recognize a marriage by a Saudi woman to a non-Saudi man and allow a citizenship application.

Saudis working in various sensitive occupations, as well as members of the royal family, are not allowed to marry foreigners at all.

== By naturalization ==
=== How to apply for citizenship ===
The applicant or his legal representative can apply to the Civil Affairs department or the Kingdom’s representative abroad. The Interior Ministry Agency of Civil Affairs is responsible for receiving and registering applications to be reviewed. A committee is formed, consisting of three members, whose ranks are not below the eighth rank, one of whom is legally qualified to verify the following:

- The applicant must have entered the Kingdom in a legal manner and hold a valid passport that enables him to return to his country without restrictions or conditions.
- The applicant must have resided, for a period of no less than ten consecutive years, under a regular residency permit in the Kingdom, with the provisions of its own system.
- The applicant must be working in one of the professions that the country needs.

Once the information is provided by the applicant, the committee will evaluate the application based on three components, representing a total of 33 points to be distributed as follows:

- Residency of the applicant for at least ten consecutive years with a total score of ten points.
- The profession of the applicant is proven through scientific qualifications and is based on the country’s needs. The total points should not exceed 13 points and only one qualification of the applicated is counted, as follows:
  - Doctorate degree in medicine or engineering allotting thirteen points
  - Doctorate degree in other sciences allotting ten points.
  - Master’s degree allotting eight points.
  - Bachelor’s degree allotting five points.
- Family ties, ensuring that the applicant has Saudi relatives. The total points should not exceed ten points, distributed as follows:
  - If the father is Saudi, he is allotted three points.
  - If the mother and her father are Saudi, three points are allotted, however if only the mother is Saudi and her father is not, two points are allotted.
  - If the wife and her father are Saudi, three points are allotted, however if the wife is Saudi and her father is not, one point is allotted.
  - If the applicant has more than two Saudi children and brothers, two points are allotted, however if there are no more than two, one point is allotted.

If the applicant obtains 23 points as a minimum score, the committee recommends that he continues reviewing his application. In the event that he does not achieve the required limit, it is recommended that the application be kept. The applications are reviewed, and the rest of the procedures are completed and submitted to the Naturalization Committee, in order to issue the final recommendation and present it to the Minister of Interior.

The following actions are taken in relation to applications for citizenships:

- Registration of the application in the records of the serial entry at the time of submission. The applicant is given a voucher indicating the number and date of the application.
- Fill out the citizenship application form with the applicant’s signature, photo and stamp from the administration.
- Fill out three copies of the information form.
- Submit an original copy of all documents supported by the applicant.
- Inform the applicant of the system’s requirements and ensure that his signature is provided stating his knowledge of the requirements.
- A medical report proving mental and physical integrity.
- A statement from the authorities concerned with the specialities that the country needs.
- A copy of the qualifications, which must be translated to Arabic if it is originally in another language.
- Submit a statement about wealth owned inside and outside the Kingdom and his sources of income.
- Submit a statement of religious denomination, political or party activity, and previous military services.

=== Conditions for obtaining citizenship ===
The following is required for an applicant for the Saudi citizenship:

- At the time of submitting the application, the applicant must have reached the age of maturity.
- The applicant must not be mentally unstable.

Upon submitting the application, the applicant must:

- Acquire the status of ordinary permanent residence in the Kingdom of Saudi Arabia, under the provisions of its system, for a period of no less than five consecutive years.
- The applicant must be of good conduct.
- The applicant must not have been sentenced to imprisonment for a moral offence for a period exceeding six months.
- The applicant must prove that he earns his income in a legitimate way.

== Revocation of citizenship ==
Revocation of Saudi citizenship may occur due to one of the following reasons:

- Working for another country's military.
- Working for another country's government.
- Holding a passport of another nation without permission from the prime minister. Dual citizenship is permitted only by birth in a foreign country which allows/enforces citizenship by birth.

Saudi citizens cannot give up their citizenship without permission; however, the government can revoke someone's nationality if said person is a terrorist or dissident, as in the case of Osama bin Laden. These laws do not revoke said person's citizenship automatically, but they are used to grant the King the authority to do so, and in case of dual citizenship, Saudi citizens are entitled to a six-month warning period to give up their other citizenship.

== Dual nationality ==
Saudis are generally not permitted to acquire any foreign citizenship without the permission of the Prime minister. A Saudi citizen who acquires a foreign citizenship without this permission will be considered Saudi unless the Saudi Government revokes their citizenship according to the terms of Article 13: takes up foreign Citizenship without permission of the Prime Minister; works for another country's military; works for the benefit of a foreign Government during wartime with the Kingdom of Saudi Arabia; works for a foreign Government or International Organization despite the Saudi Government's order for them to quit. Sarah Attar is a Saudi woman who also has American nationality.

== Travel freedom ==
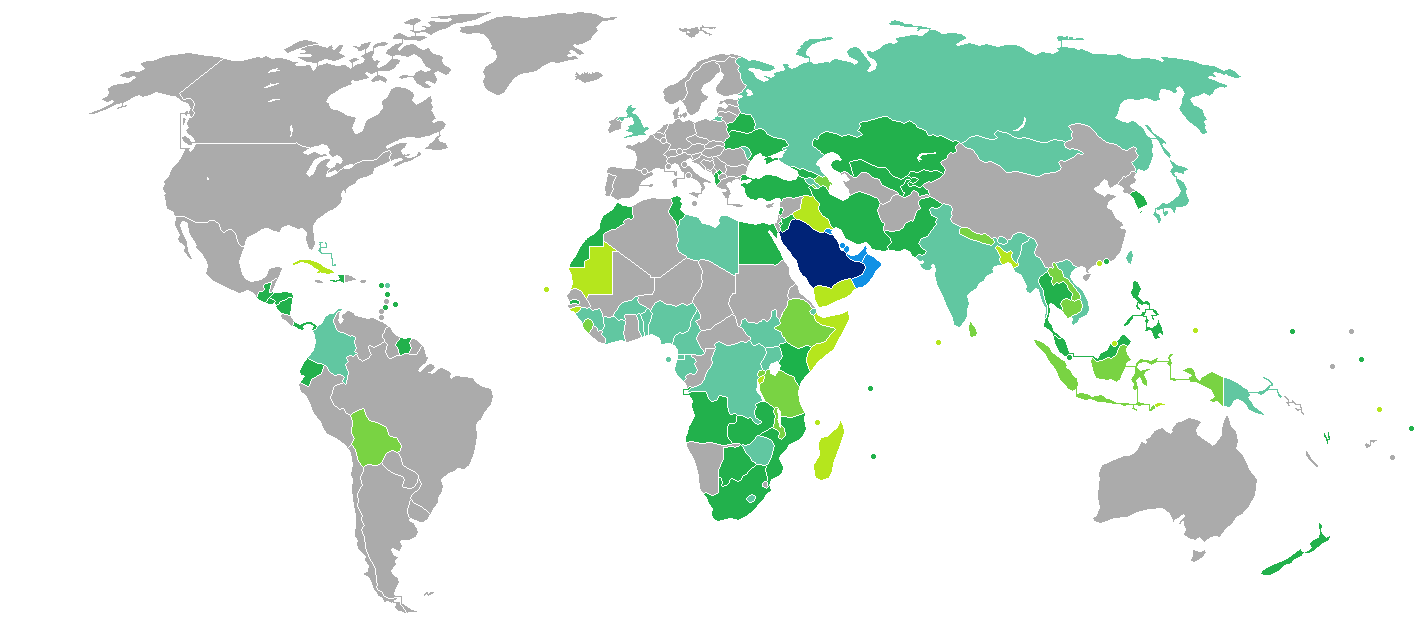
Visa requirements for Saudi citizens

In 2018, Saudi citizens had visa-free or visa on arrival access to 74 countries and territories, ranking the Saudi passport 60th in the world according to the Visa Restrictions Index.

As of 2026, Saudi citizens have visa-free or visa on arrival access to 88 countries and territories, ranking the Saudi passport 51st in the world, according to the Henley Passport Index.
