= Visa policy of Saudi Arabia =

Policy on permits required to enter Saudi Arabia

Visitors to Saudi Arabia must obtain a visa from one of the Saudi diplomatic missions unless they are citizens from one of the visa-exempt countries or citizens who may obtain either a visa on arrival or an e-Visa.

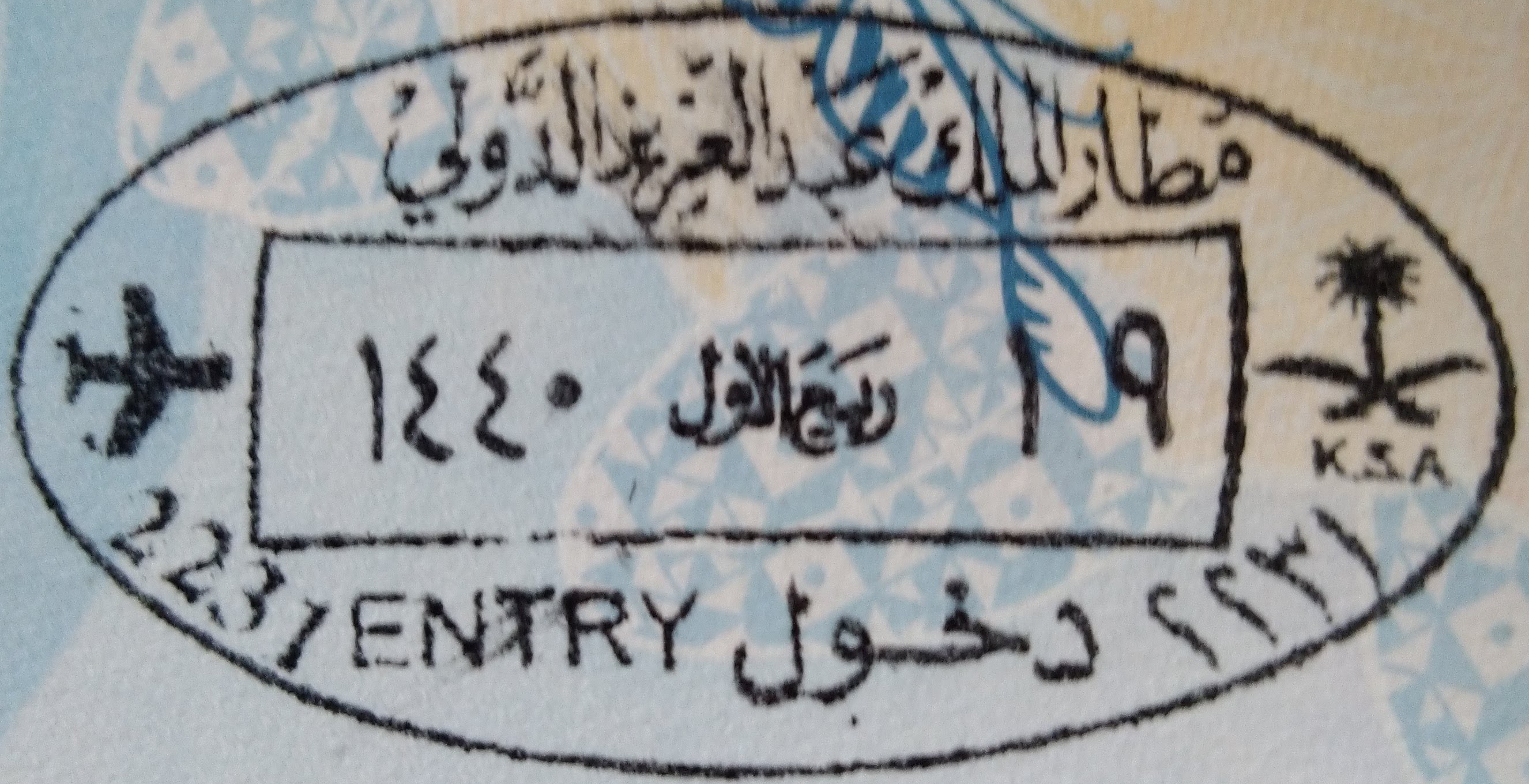
Saudi entry stamp received at Jeddah Airport

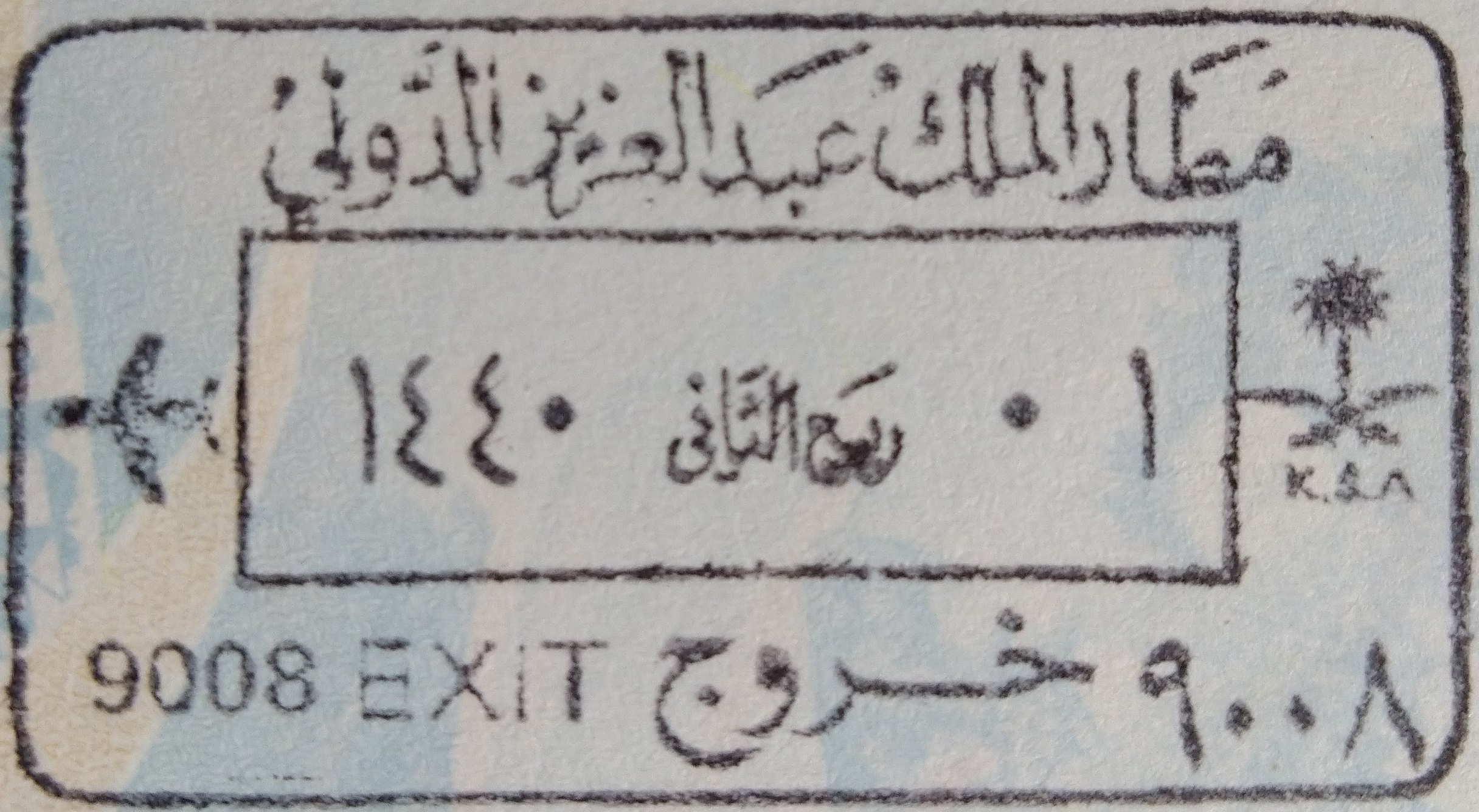
Saudi exit stamp received at Jeddah Airport

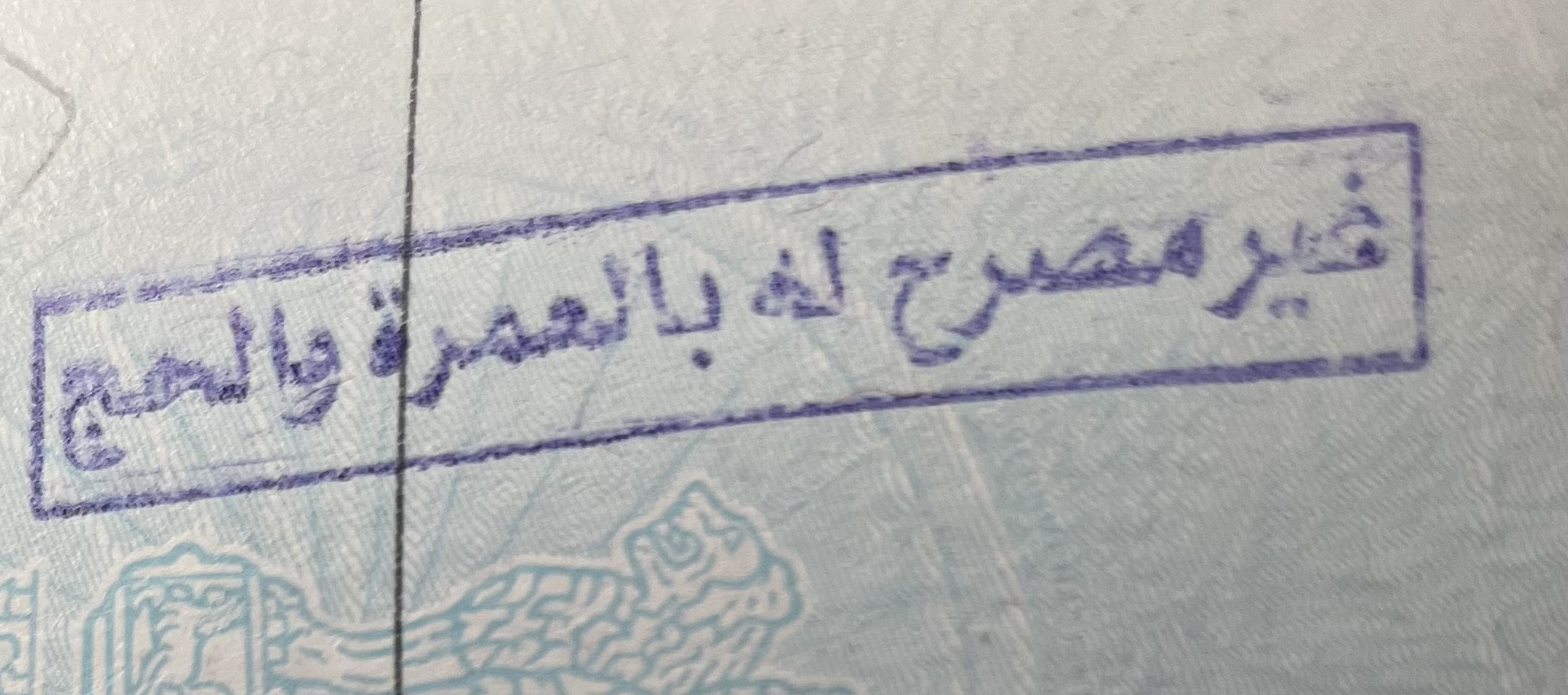
Passport stamp received at Medina Airport in 2019 that reads 'Unauthorized to perform Umrah and Hajj', highlighting Saudi Arabia's visa restrictions at that time. Until 2020, non-Umrah visa holders were not permitted to perform the rites of Umrah.

All visitors must hold a passport valid for at least 6 months from the date of arrival.

== Visa policy map ==
Visa policy of Saudi Arabia Saudi Arabia Freedom of movement Visa not required (90 days) Electronic Travel Authorization Visa on arrival / eVisa Visa required Admission refused

== Visa exemption ==
=== Freedom of movement ===
Citizens of Gulf Cooperation Council (GCC) countries enjoy freedom of movement in Saudi Arabia and may enter with a national ID card.

- Bahrain
- Kuwait
- Oman
- Qatar
- United Arab Emirates

=== Ordinary passports ===
90 days within a calendar year

- Russia

Russia is the first country, excluding GCC countries, to sign a visa exemption agreement with Saudi Arabia for ordinary passport holders. However, Visa is required to perform Hajj or Umrah during the Hajj season.

=== Non-ordinary passports ===
Holders of diplomatic, official or service passport of the following countries may enter without a visa for 90 days within any 180-day period.(unless otherwise stated):

- Albania
- Angola^{3}
- Azerbaijan
- Bosnia and Herzegovina
- China
- Costa Rica
- Cyprus
- Djibouti^{1}
- Egypt
- France
- Greece
- Hong Kong^{3}
- Hungary
- India
- Italy
- Japan
- Jordan
- Kazakhstan
- Kosovo
- Kyrgyzstan
- Malta
- Malaysia
- Mauritius
- Monaco
- Mongolia
- Poland
- Portugal
- Russia^{2}
- Singapore^{1}
- Solomon Islands
- South Korea
- Spain
- Tajikistan
- Thailand
- Turkey
- United Kingdom^{1}
- Uzbekistan

_{1 - Indefinite period}
_{2 - 90 days within a calendar year.}
_{3 - 30 days}

=== Future changes ===
Saudi Arabia has signed visa exemption agreements with the following countries, but they have not yet entered into force:

Country	Passports	Agreement signed on
Pakistan	Diplomatic , special	September 2026
Paraguay	Diplomatic, special	September 2026
Serbia	Diplomatic, special, service	September 2026
Ukraine	Diplomatic, special, service	November 2026

=== Electronic Travel Authorization (ETA) ===
Citizens of the following countries may obtain an Electronic Travel Authorization (ETA) instead of a visa:

- United Kingdom
The waiver can be used for single or multiple entry with a maximum stay of 6 months. The waiver can be used for tourism, business, education and medical reasons, according to the published infographic.

On 2 August 2023, the Twitter account of the Ministry of Foreign Affairs announced that with immediate effect Saudi Arabia launched an electronic visa waiver for citizens of the United Kingdom of Great Britain and Northern Ireland to enter Saudi Arabia.

== Visa on arrival / Electronic visa (e-Visa) ==
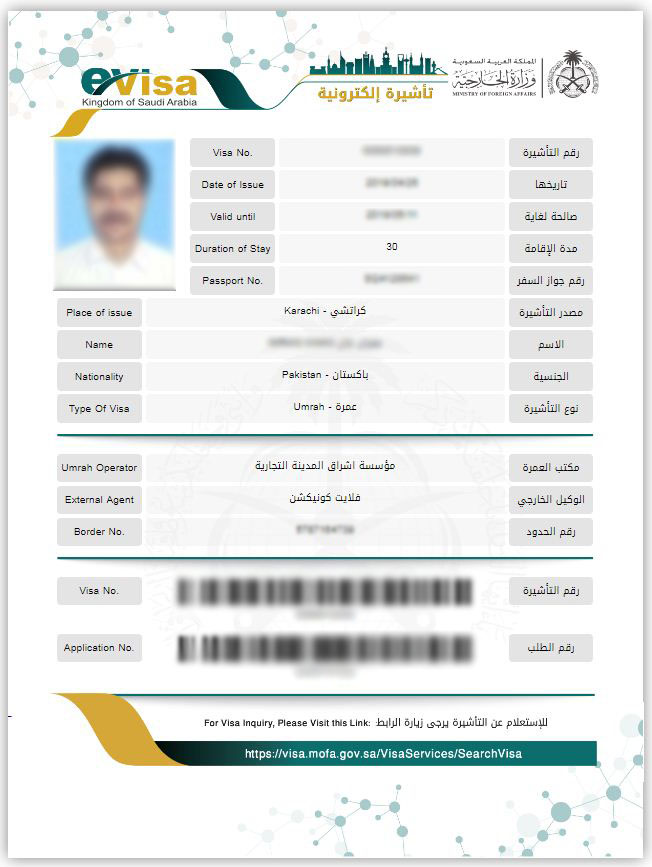
Sample of Saudi Umrah eVisa

Saudi Arabia started to issue tourist visas online and on arrival from 28 September 2019. Holders of passports of the following countries or territories may obtain an e-Visa for a fee prior to arrival or on arrival to Saudi Arabia and this visa is valid for 90 days:

- All European Union member states

- Andorra
- Albania
- Australia
- Azerbaijan
- Bahamas
- Barbados
- Bosnia and Herzegovina
- Brunei
- Canada
- China
- Georgia
- Grenada
- Guyana
- Hong Kong
- Iceland
- Japan
- Kazakhstan
- Kosovo
- Kyrgyzstan
- Liechtenstein
- Macau
- Malaysia
- Maldives
- Mauritius
- Mexico
- Monaco
- Montenegro
- New Zealand
- North Macedonia
- Norway
- Panama
- Russia
- Saint Kitts and Nevis
- San Marino
- Serbia
- Seychelles
- Singapore
- South Africa
- South Korea
- Switzerland
- Taiwan
- Tajikistan
- Thailand
- Turkey
- Ukraine
- United Kingdom
- United States
- Uzbekistan

=== Substitute visa ===
Since January 2020, holders of a US, UK or Schengen visas have been eligible for a Saudi eVisa upon arrival, as long as the other visa is still valid and it has been used at least once to travel to the respective country/area. This eligibility is only permissible through airlines based in Saudi Arabia, such as Saudia, Flynas and Flyadeal.

=== Package eVisa ===
Saudi Arabia introduced the Package eVisa scheme in July 2026, allowing nationals of selected countries to apply for an electronic tourist visa through an approved travel package. Unlike the standard tourist eVisa, eligibility under this scheme is conditional on purchasing a qualifying package from an approved tourism provider.

The scheme covers nationals of the following countries:

- Bangladesh
- Egypt
- India
- Indonesia
- Jordan
- Mexico
- Pakistan

== History ==
On 1 September 2022, a decree was announced allowing residents of GCC countries to apply for Saudi e-Visas online and residents of the United States, United Kingdom and European Union may apply for a visa on arrival.

On 6 August 2023, Saudi Arabia announced the expansion of its visitor e-visa scheme to the nationals of eight countries:

- Albania
- Azerbaijan
- Georgia
- Kyrgyzstan
- Maldives
- South Africa
- Tajikistan
- Uzbekistan

On 17 October 2023, Saudi Arabia added 6 new countries to e-visa pool:

- Mauritius
- Panama
- Saint Kitts and Nevis
- Seychelles
- Thailand
- Turkey

In May 2024 Saudi Arabia added 3 new countries to eVisa eligibility:

- Bahamas
- Barbados
- Grenada

On 4 October 2026, Saudi Arabia added 2 new countries to eVisa eligibility:

- Guyana
- Kosovo

On 5 November 2026, Saudi Arabia added 4 new countries to eVisa eligibility:

- Bosnia and Herzegovina
- Mexico
- North Macedonia
- Serbia

Saudi Arabia is considering issuing eVisas to Vietnamese visitors to boost tourism.

For a period of time, citizens of Qatar were banned from entering Saudi Arabia, UAE and Bahrain unless they were married to a local person. (Qatar–Saudi Arabia diplomatic conflict)

Saudi Arabia and Russia signed a mutual visa exemption agreement for 90 days on 1 December 2025 and which entered into force on 11 May 2026. The Russian Federation is the first country with which the Kingdom has signed a mutual visa exemption agreement that includes holders of regular passports.

== Israel ==
- Israel
Citizens of Israel are refused entry and transit in general. However, Saudi Arabia has made exceptions to issuing special visas only for some important business ventures between Saudi Arabia and Israel.

Since the introduction of the e-visa program in September 2019, the Ministry of Tourism mentions on their website that having an Israeli stamp on the passport does not disqualify someone from visiting Saudi Arabia.

== Hajj visas ==
A special visa category exists for pilgrims going to Saudi Arabia on the Hajj. Applications are encouraged to be done via licensed travel agents and are accepted between 14th Shawwal and 25th Dhu al-Qadah.

Muslim female passengers arriving to perform Umrah or Hajj must either be accompanied by an immediate male family member such as a father, brother, husband, or son, who must be aged 18 years or older; or be over 45 years of age and travelling within a group of female passengers of the same age, who are accompanied by a group leader until their departure.

The Nusuk platform is also used in parts of Saudi Arabia's pilgrimage visa and booking processes. Its Nusuk Hajj channel lists Hajj packages for pilgrims from serviced countries, while Nusuk Umrah allows pilgrims from abroad to apply directly for Umrah visas and book related services online.

== Development of tourist visas ==
In December 2013 Saudi Arabia announced its intention to begin issuing tourist visas for the first time in its history. The Council of Ministers entrusted the Supreme Commission for Tourism and Antiquities with visa issuing on the basis of certain regulations approved by the Ministries of Interior and Foreign Affairs. A limited tourist visa programme was cancelled in March 2014. In December 2014 the Saudi Arabian authorities reiterated that tourist visas would not be reintroduced. However, in April 2016, former Crown Prince Muhammad bin Nayef announced that plans to start issuing tourist visas as part of Vision 2030, which aims to diversify the Saudi economy and lead it away from oil dependence. Saudi Arabia has welcomed Uber and Six Flags parks in its initial steps towards amplifying the tourism sector. In November 2017 it was announced that Saudi Arabia would begin issuing tourist visas and online applications in 2018.

Non-Muslims (of whatever nationality) are not allowed to travel to Mecca and Medina.

Full rules were expected to be published by the end of March 2018. In March 2018 the Saudi Commission for Tourism and National Heritage announced that the bylaws were ready for adoption and that they would be published by the end of the first quarter of 2018.

On 25 September 2018, the General Sports Authority announced the "Sharek International Events Visa" (SIEV), an electronic visa issued concurrently with the purchase of a ticket for qualifying special sporting events, concerts or cultural festivals through sharek.sa. The "Sharek" visa allows visitors to enter Saudi Arabia in order to attend the event and its validity ranges from a few days before and after the event itself. Applicants will be able to obtain single-entry, single-exit 30-day visas online for 640 riyals (US$170.65) and enter from any port of entry. It was reported by the UAE news agency WAM that the Kingdom is set to open the eVisa system to general visitors holding passports from the United States, all Schengen (EU) countries, Australia, Japan, South Korea, South Africa, Brunei, Malaysia and Singapore with more countries to be added later.

On 2 March 2019, Saudi Arabia announced a new visa category that will be issued for foreign visitors to attend sport, entertainment and business events in the country.

On 5 March 2019, the Wall Street Journal reported that "Saudi officials plan to allow citizens of the U.S., much of Europe, Japan and China either visa-free access to the kingdom for tourism or a visa on arrival by the end of [2019]", according to people involved in the effort to introduce these visa reforms. "The effort is meant to make visiting Saudi Arabia about as easy as traveling to neighboring Arab tourist hot spots such as Dubai."

On 27 September 2019, Saudi Arabia introduced an e-visa program, allowing people from 49 countries to visit, by applying for a visa ahead of their trip or on arrival. Single entry visa allows a full month stay, while multiple entry visas allow to stay for up to three months. The visa cost 440 Saudi riyals (US$117), including a health insurance fee. The tourists visiting the country will be obliged to follow the regulations that Saudi Arabia has mentioned on its travel website.

In October 2019, Saudi Arabia modified its policy for the tourists, and announced that it will allow foreign men and women to share hotel rooms without proving they are related. Saudi Commission for Tourism and National Heritage said that only Saudi nationals would be asked for family ID or proof of relationship on checking into hotels. Additionally, all women, including Saudis, were permitted to book and stay in hotel alone by providing ID on check-in.

== GCC Unified Tourist Visa ==
The Gulf Cooperation Council (GCC) announced in September 2025 that it will introduce a Schengen-style visa enabling travel across Saudi Arabia, United Arab Emirates, Qatar, Kuwait, Bahrain and Oman under a single permit.

The visa will be issued through a centralized digital platform and is expected to offer multiple-entry access with a validity of 30 to 90 days. It will apply to tourism only. Each member state will maintain authority over entry conditions, security checks, and admissibility decisions.

== See also ==
- Visa requirements for Saudi citizens
- Saudi Arabian passport
