= Saudi passport =

Passport of the Kingdom of Saudi Arabia

- The front cover of a contemporary Saudi biometric passport
- Type: Passport
- Issued by: (Saudi Arabia) Ministry of Interior and Foreign Affairs (Saudi Arabia) Diplomatic embassies and consulates abroad
- First issued: 10 February 2022 (biometric passport)
- Purpose: Identification
- Eligibility: Saudi Arabian citizenship
- Expiration: 5 lunar years or 3 solar years for people aged under 21; 5 to 10 lunar years or 3 to 5 solar years for people aged 21 or older
- Cost: 300 SAR / $80 USD for 5 lunar years or 3 solar years 600 SAR / $160 USD for 10 lunar years or 5 solar years

The Saudi passport (Arabic: جواز السفر السعودي) is a passport document issued to citizens of Saudi Arabia for international travel.

== Passport issuance procedures ==
An applicant is required to fill in an online form for the first time. In the case of passport renewal, an applicant is not required to fill in the form where the passport can be renewed with a few online steps through Absher online platform. An applicant must have a valid Government ID to be able to issue the passport. The passport photo must be taken whilst the applicant is in Saudi dress, unless the applicant is underage and has no Government ID card. The photo must be 100 mm × 150 mm (4 in × 6 in) in size. The applicant must fill the form in both Arabic and English.

All procedures are carried out electronically through the platform Absher. This platform enables applicants to apply for a new passport or passport renewal without the requirement of attendance in person.

== History ==
On 10 February 2022, the Ministry of Interior released a new version of the Saudi Passport with darker green cover page, the addition of a biometric chip, and a new data page physical appearance.

== Physical appearance ==
The current Saudi passport is green, with the Emblem of Saudi Arabia emblazoned in the top of the front cover. "المملكة العربية السعودية" "Kingdom of Saudi Arabia" is written below the emblem. Toward the bottom of the cover are inscribed "جواز سفر" "Passport" and, below it, the international e-passport symbol.

=== Identity information page ===
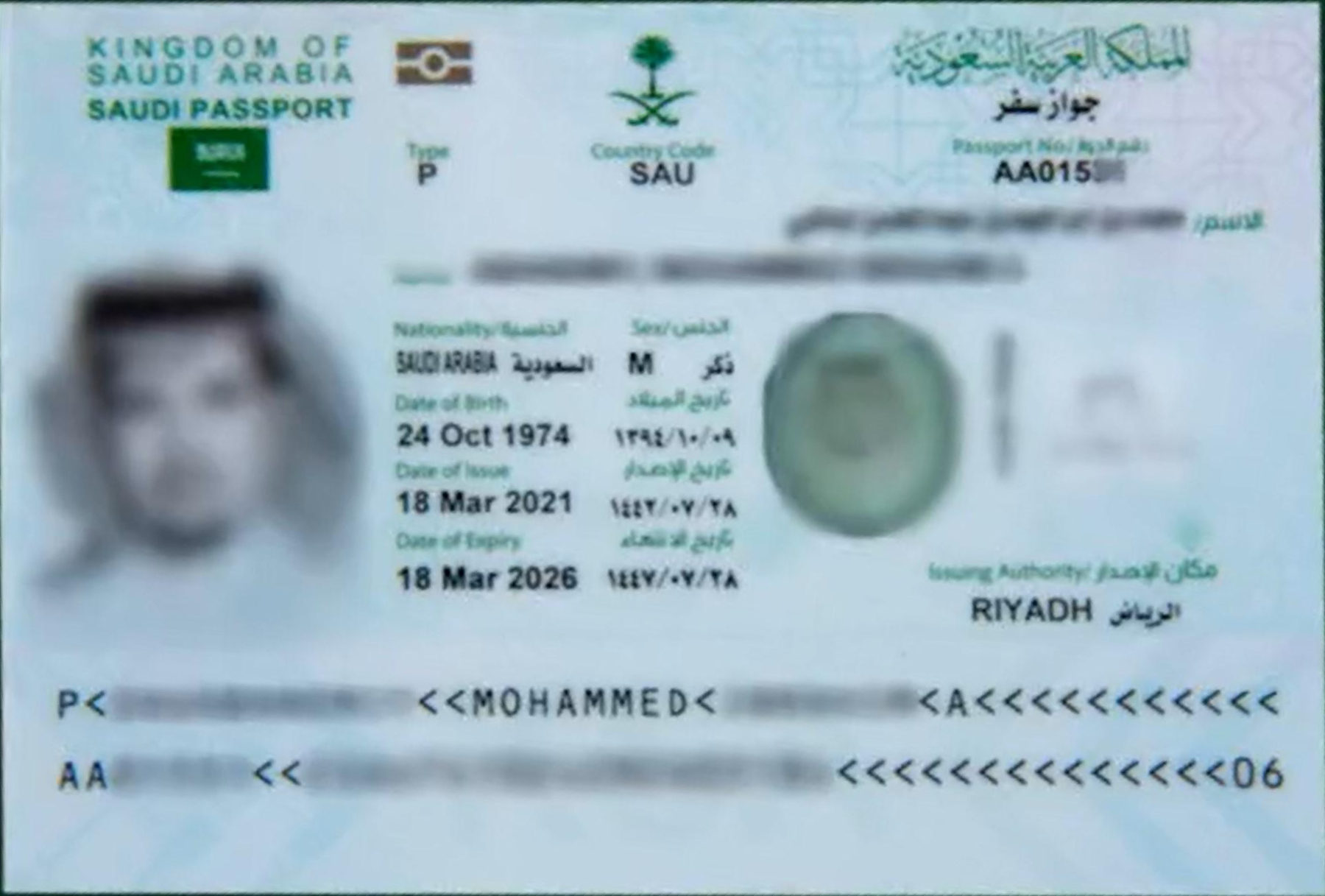
Saudi ePassport information page

The Saudi passport includes the following data:

- Photo of passport holder
- Type (of document, which is P for "Passport")
- Country Code (listed as SAU for "Saudi Arabia")
- Passport No.
- Name
- Nationality (Saudi Arabia)
- Sex
- Date of birth (in Islamic and Gregorian calendars)
- Date of issue (in Islamic and Gregorian calendars)
- Date of expiry (in Islamic and Gregorian calendars)
- Issuing Authority

The information page ends with the machine readable zone.

=== Passport note ===
The passports contain inside the front cover a note that is addressed to the authorities of all countries and territories, identifying the bearer as a citizen of Saudi Arabia and requesting that he or she be allowed to pass and be treated according to international norms:

In Arabic:

باسم ملك المملكة العربية السعودية، أطلب من موظفي المملكة المدنيين والعسكريين وممثليها في الخارج ومن كل سلطة أخرى تعمل باسمها، ومن السلطات المختصة في الدول الصديقة أن يسمحوا لحامل هذا الجواز بحرية المرور وأن يقدموا له المساعدة والرعاية.

In English:

In the name of the King, of the Kingdom of Saudi Arabia, I request all whom it may concern to permit the bearer of this passport to pass freely, and to afford the bearer such assistance and protection required.

=== Languages ===
The passport is printed in both Arabic and English.

== Visa requirements ==
Visa requirements for Saudi citizens holding ordinary passports Saudi Arabia Freedom of movement Visa not required / Electronic Travel Authorisation Visa on arrival eVisa Visa available both on arrival or online Visa required

As of April 2025, Saudi citizens had visa-free or visa on arrival access to 86 countries and territories, ranking the Saudi passport 58th in the world in terms of travel freedom according to the Henley Passport Index.

Saudi citizens have freedom of movement within Gulf Cooperation Council states.

== See also ==
- Visa requirements for Saudi citizens
- Saudi Arabian National ID Card
