= Saudi Arabian identity card =

National identity card of Saudi Arabia

Saudi national ID card
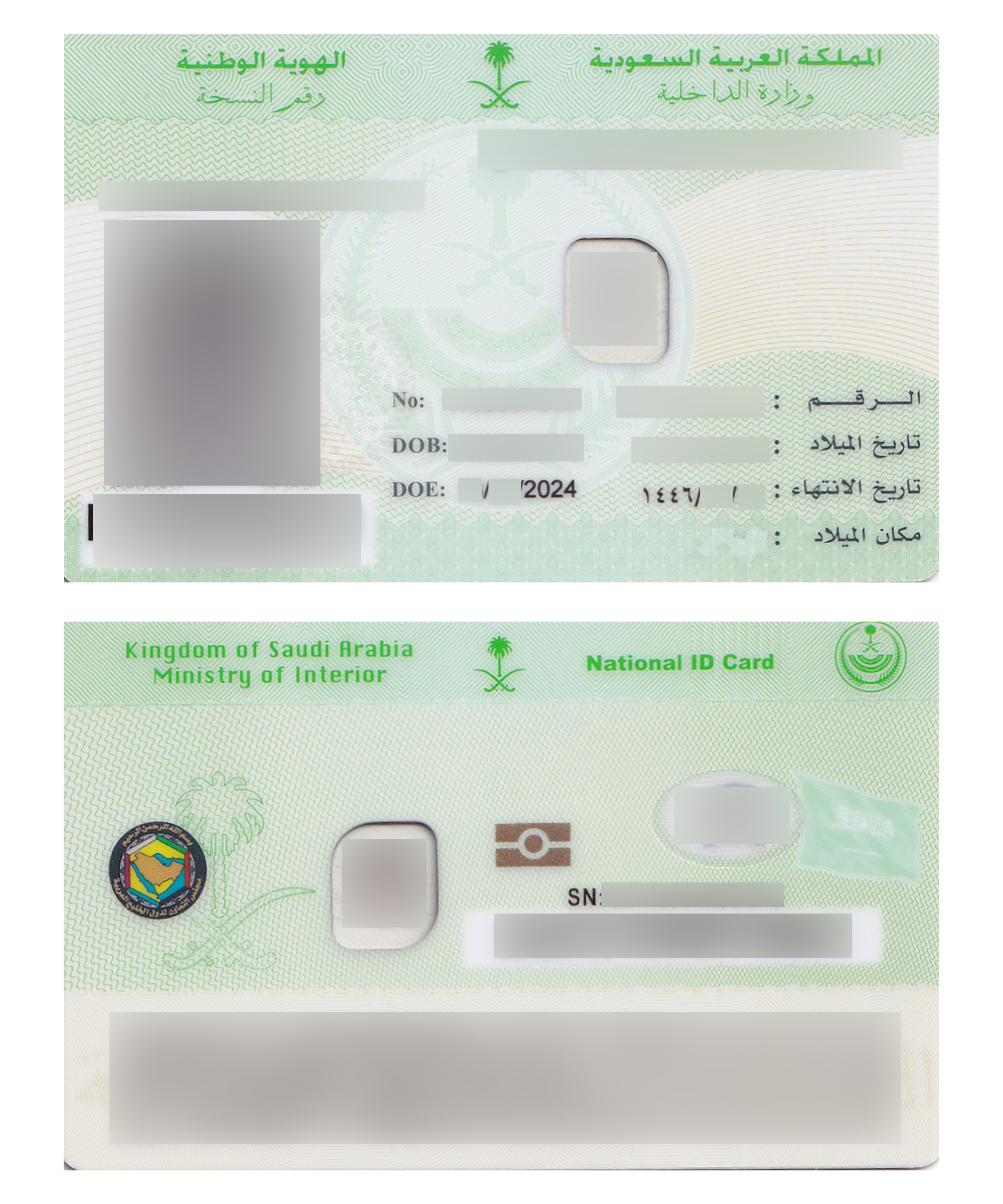
- Type: Identity card
- Issued by: Saudi Arabia
- Valid in: GCC countries

The Saudi National ID Card (Arabic: Biṭāgat Al-hawiyya Al-waṭaniyya بطاقة الهوية الوطنية), commonly known by its old colloquial name Biṭāgat Al-ʼaḥwāl (Arabic: بطاقة الأحوال [bɪˈtˤaːgat alʔaħˈwaːl]), is a Saudi Arabian identity card and proof of citizenship. The card is used for identification with "government agencies and third party service providers such as banks". The card may also be used for travel within the countries of the Gulf Cooperation Council (GCC) since April 2025.

== Physical appearance and data storage ==
The card is credit-card-sized and contains a 2.86-megabyte optical stripe and a contact chip to store data, as well as finger prints and a facial image. The card does contain a barcode, but no machine-readable zone. All fields of the card are in Arabic except for the texts National ID Card and Kingdom of Saudi Arabia, Ministry of Interior, which is also present in English.

== See also ==
- Saudi Arabian passport
