= Uzbekistan passport =

Passport issued to the citizens of Uzbekistan

Uzbek passport
- Front cover of the Uzbek passport
- Type: Passport
- Issued by: Uzbekistan Ministry of Internal Affairs
- First issued: January 1992 (First non-Biometric passport) · January 2011 (Biometric passport introduced) · 27 August 2012 (full Biometric rollout) · 1 January 2019 (Red international Biometric passport)
- Purpose: Identification International travel
- Valid in: All countries.
- Eligibility: Uzbek citizenship
- Expiration: 5 years for individuals under 25 and 10 years for individuals over 25 years old
- Cost: 244,000 сўм for both adults and children

Uzbekistan passport (Uzbek: Oʻzbekiston fuqarosining pasporti) are issued to citizens of the Republic of Uzbekistan to facilitate international travel. Within the Republic of Uzbekistan, citizens are required to use the Uzbekistan identity card (ID-card), which was introduced on 1 January 2021 to replace the previous biometric internal passports. While the ID card is primarily for internal use, citizens are now permitted to enter some neighboring countries using only their national ID card, following simplified border-crossing agreements. For most other international travel, the Ministry of Internal Affairs issues biometric international passports (burgundy cover), a system that has been in place since 1 January 2019.

== History ==
Following the dissolution of the Soviet Union and the regaining of independence, the first Uzbekistan passport was issued and was used both as internal identity document and travel document. The first sample that was issued from 1992 was non-biometric, in green colour. From 2012 the current, biometric version is in use. Until 2020, the Uzbekistan passport was used both as internal and external identity document. From 2020, with the introduction of Uzbekistan identity card the Uzbekistan passport is used only for international travel.

== Overview ==
The passport contains 48 pages. Pictures with historical sights of Uzbekistan, watermarks, octagonal pentagram, color-changing paint, moiré effect, metallized security thread, laminated film, as well as an embedded electronic chip is added to the sheets. It is in the Uzbek and English languages.

Since 2012 Uzbekistan has been switching gradually to the green colour biometric passport system. The old (non-biometric) passports were invalid since the beginning of 2016 internationally, and until 2018 inside the country. From 1 January 2019, onwards the issuance of present burgundy color international passports had been started. Green color biometric passport was valid for travelling internationally until 31 December 2020. Inside the country it is valid until expired as per the passport expiration date.

== Identity information page ==
The Uzbek passport includes the following data:

- Type ('P' for Passport)
- Country code ('UZB' for Uzbekistan)
- Passport number
- Surname
- Given Names
- Place of birth
- Father's Name
- Date of birth (in DD-MM-YYYY format, such as 28-07-2019)
- Sex ('M' or 'F')
- Place of Birth
- Date of issue (in DD-MM-YYYY format)
- Date of expiry (in DD-MM-YYYY format, must be renewed every 10 years)
- Authority

== Visa requirements ==
Countries and territories with visa-free entries or visas on arrival for holders of regular international Uzbekistan passports

As of 5 January 2021, 25 visa-free countries and 33 visa-on-arrival countries, as a result, ranking the Uzbekistan passport 91st in terms of travel freedom according to the Henley Passport Index. As of November 2023, Uzbekistan ranked 83.

== See also ==
- Visa requirements for Uzbekistan citizens
