= Visa policy of Uzbekistan =

Policy on permits required to enter Uzbekistan

Visitors to Uzbekistan must obtain a visa from one of the Uzbekistan diplomatic missions unless they are citizens from one of the visa-exempt countries or citizens eligible for an e-Visa.

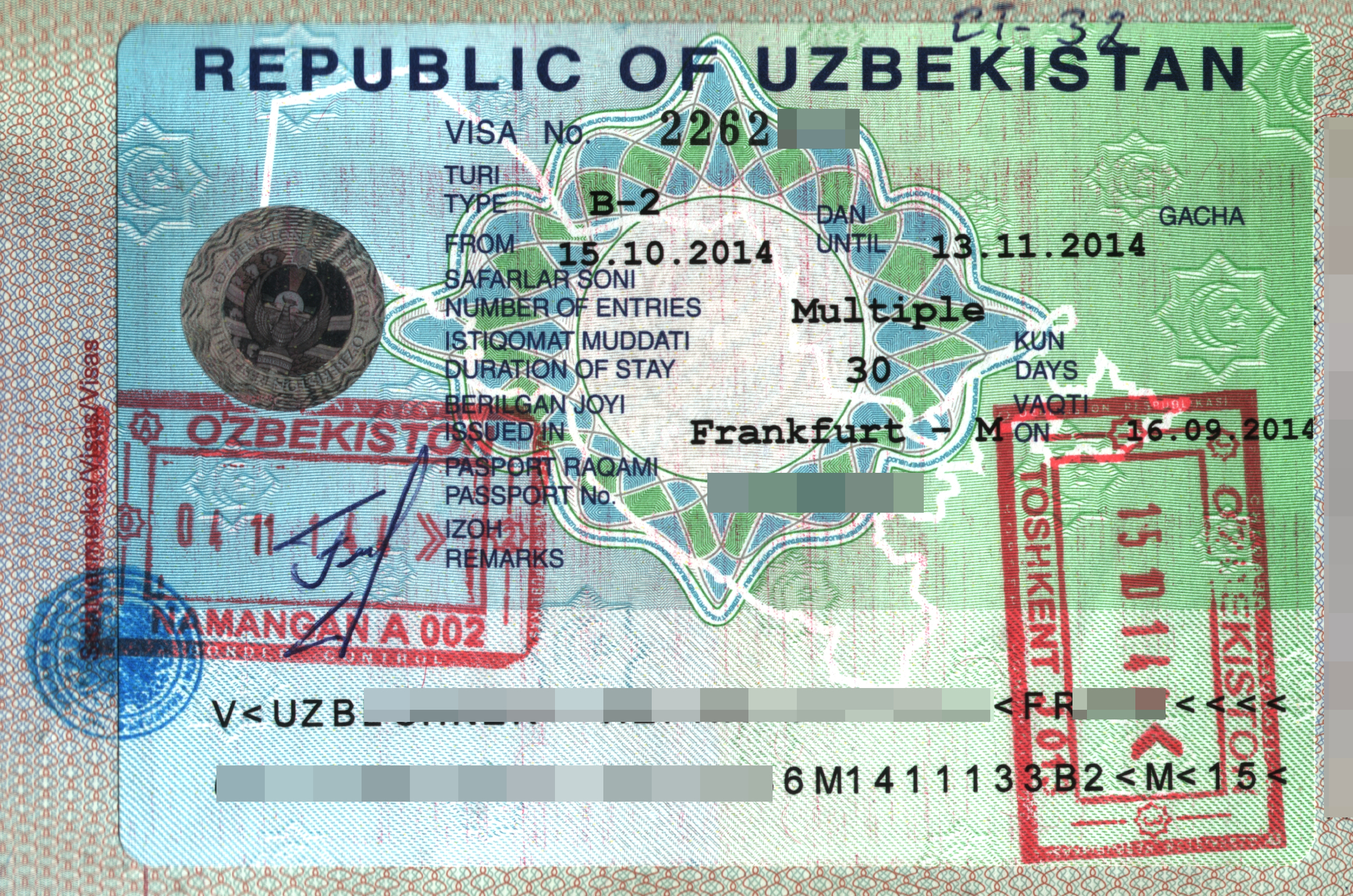
Sample of Uzbekistani multiple-entry tourist visa

Uzbekistan's visa and other migration policies are also implemented in accordance with the mobility rights arrangements within the Commonwealth of Independent States.

== Visa policy map ==
Visa policy of Uzbekistan Uzbekistan Visa not required (unlimited period) Visa not required - may enter with an ID card (60 days) Visa not required (30 days) Visa not required (10 days) Visa not required for transit to a third country (5 days); otherwise, visa required eVisa (30 days) Visa required

== Visa exemption ==
=== Ordinary passports ===
Citizens of the following countries and territories may enter Uzbekistan without a visa for the following period:

Unlimited period

- Armenia
- Azerbaijan
- Belarus
- Georgia
- Kazakhstan
- Moldova
- Russia
- Ukraine

60 days

- Kyrgyzstan^{ID}

30 days

- All European Union member states

- Andorra
- Antigua and Barbuda
- Argentina
- Australia
- Bahamas
- Bahrain
- Barbados
- Belize
- Bosnia and Herzegovina
- Brazil
- Brunei
- Canada
- Chile
- China^{C}
- Costa Rica
- Cuba
- Dominica
- Dominican Republic
- El Salvador
- Grenada
- Guatemala
- Honduras
- India^{i}
- Iceland
- Indonesia
- Israel
- Jamaica
- Japan
- Jordan
- Kuwait
- Liechtenstein
- Malaysia
- Mexico
- Monaco
- Mongolia
- Montenegro
- New Zealand
- Nicaragua
- Norway
- Oman
- Panama
- Qatar
- Saint Kitts and Nevis
- Saint Lucia
- Saint Vincent and the Grenadines
- San Marino
- Saudi Arabia
- Serbia
- Singapore
- South Korea
- Switzerland
- Tajikistan
- Trinidad and Tobago
- Turkey
- United Arab Emirates
- United Kingdom (Note: Including all types of British passports.)
- United States
- Vatican City

10 days

- Hong Kong^{C}
- Macau^{C}

_{ID - May enter with an ID card.}
_{i - For Indian citizens holding a valid, multiple-entry visa from Australia, Canada, Japan, New Zealand, South Korea, the UK, the USA, or any Schengen Area country.}
_{C - For Chinese citizens with People's Republic of China passports, Hong Kong Special Administrative Region passports or Macau Special Administrative Region passports only.}

==== Conditional visa exemption ====
In addition, citizens of the following countries who meet specific criteria such as requirement to hold a return ticket, in certain age groups and as part of an organised tour group may also enter Uzbekistan without a visa, for a stay up to the duration listed below:

| Duration of stay | Condition | Hong Kong | Macau | Vietnam | India |
|---|---|---|---|---|---|
| 90 days | Aged under 16, travelling for tourism and accompanied by a legal guardian | Yes | Yes | Yes | Yes |
| 30 days | Aged 55 or above, traveling individually | | | Yes | |
| 30 days | Aged 55 or above, traveling in an organized tour group | Yes | Yes | Yes | |
| 30 days | Must hold a valid, multiple-entry visa from Australia, Canada, Japan, New Zealand, South Korea, the UK, the USA, or any Schengen Area country | | | | Yes |
| 10 days | Presenting an air ticket destined to a third country, or a return ticket within the 10 day visa-free validity period. | Yes | Yes | | |

Date of visa changes

History of visa policy of Uzbekistan. Green — visa not required (with conditions).

Citizens or Armenia, Azerbaijan, Belarus, Georgia, Kazakhstan, Moldova, Russia and Ukraine have never required a visa to enter Uzbekistan.

- 12 February 2007: Kyrgyzstan(resumed) (60 days, bilateral)
- 10 February 2018: Israel, Indonesia, Japan, South Korea, Malaysia, Singapore, Turkey (30 days, unilateral)
- 16 March 2018: Tajikistan(resumed) (30 days, bilateral)
- 5 October 2018: France (30 days, unilateral)
- 15 January 2019: Germany (30 days, unilateral)
- 1 February 2019: European Union countries (except France and Germany), Andorra, Argentina, Australia, Bosnia and Herzegovina, Brazil, Brunei, Canada, Chile, Iceland, Liechtenstein, Monaco, Mongolia, Montenegro, New Zealand, Norway, San Marino, Serbia, Switzerland, Vatican (30 days, unilateral)
- 20 March 2019: United Arab Emirates (30 days, unilateral)
- 1 January 2020: Antigua and Barbuda, Bahamas, Barbados, Belize, Costa Rica, Cuba, Dominica, Dominican Republic, El Salvador, Grenada, Guatemala, Honduras, Jamaica, Mexico, Nicaragua, Panama, Saint Kitts and Nevis, Saint Lucia, Saint Vincent and the Grenadines, Trinidad and Tobago (30 days, unilateral)
- 1 March 2021: Bahrain, Kuwait, Oman, Qatar, China, Hong Kong, Macao (10 days, unilateral)
- 1 January 2023: Saudi Arabia (30 days, unilateral)
- 5 June 2023: Qatar (30 days, unilateral)
- 1 June 2025: China (30 days, bilateral); Oman, Bahrain, Kuwait (30 days, unilateral)
- 25 September 2025: Jordan (30 days, bilateral)
- 1 January 2026: United States (30 days, unilateral)
- 1 September 2026: India (30 days, unilateral, conditional*)

Cancelled:

- 11 October 1993: Poland (was resumed in 2019)
- 7 November 1999: Turkmenistan
- 1 August 2000: Kyrgyzstan (was resumed in 2007)
- 11 September 2000: Tajikistan (was resumed in 2018)

Turkmenistan - residents of Dashoghuz Velayat and Lebap Velayat of Turkmenistan have visa free access to Khorazm Vilayat and Bukhara Vilayat as well as to Amudarya, Khojayli, Shumanay, Qonghirat districts and the Takhiatash city of Karakalpakstan and to Dehkanabad, Guzar, Nishan and Mirishkar districts of Qashqadarya Vilayat and to Sherabad and Muzrabat districts of Surkhandarya Vilayat have visa free access for up to 3 days within any month period. During Eid al-Fitr and Eid al-Adha the access is allowed twice a month, but no more than 7 days.

Turkmenistan — from February 28, 2024, entry into the Uzbekistan-Turkmenistan Free Trade Zone will be organized through separate checkpoints. Citizens of Turkmenistan, as well as foreigners, will be able to stay visa-free for up to 15 days. The zone is located on a 3.1-hectare site in the Shavat district of Khorezm.

==== Substitute visa ====
Citizens of a residence permit issued by the United Arab Emirates that is valid for at least 90 days on arrival may enter the United Arab Emirates without a visa for a maximum of 30 days.

==== Future changes ====
Uzbekistan has signed or plans to sign visa exemption agreements with the following countries, but they are not yet in force:

| Country | Duration of stay | Visa exemption agreement signed on |
|---|---|---|
| Hong Kong | 30 days | Yet to sign |
| India | 30 days | Yet to sign |
| Macao | TBA | Yet to sign |
| Oman | 30 days | 17 November, 2026 |
| Thailand | TBA | Yet to sign |
| Vietnam | TBA | Yet to sign |

=== Non-ordinary passports ===
In addition, holders of diplomatic passports of Albania, Brazil, China, Estonia, Hungary, India (60 days), Kuwait, Poland, Saudi Arabia (90 days), Serbia (90 days), South Korea (60 days), Tajikistan, Turkey, United Arab Emirates (90 days) and Vietnam and holders of diplomatic and service passports of Latvia, Romania and Slovakia may enter Uzbekistan without a visa.

=== Future changes ===
Uzbekistan has signed or plans to sign visa exemption agreements with the following countries, but they have not yet entered into force:

| Country | Passports | Agreement signed on |
|---|---|---|
| Oman | Diplomatic, service | 26 June 2024 |

== Electronic visa (e-Visa) ==
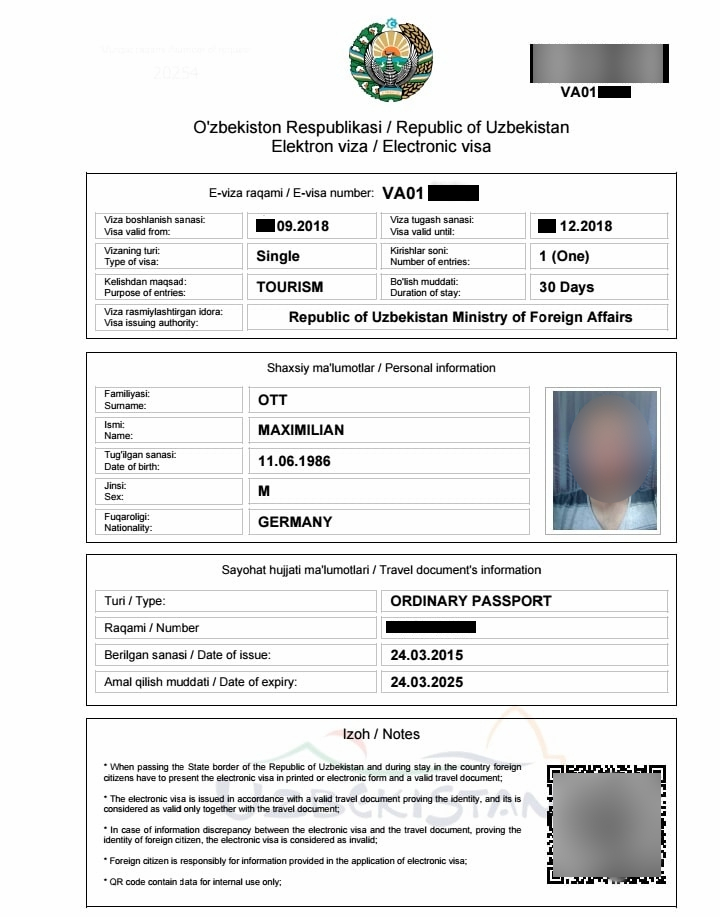
Sample of Uzbekistani eVisa

Uzbekistan introduced the system of electronic visas for a period of up to 30 days from 15 July 2018. A single or multiple entry visa is valid for 30 days. The cost of obtaining an e-Visa is US$20. Travelers have to apply for the e-Visa for Uzbekistan at least three days in advance before their trip.

e-Visa is available to the citizens of the following countries and territories:

- Albania
- Algeria
- Angola
- Bhutan
- Bolivia
- Cambodia
- Colombia
- Ecuador
- Egypt
- Fiji
- Guinea-Bissau
- Guyana
- Iran
- Kiribati
- Laos
- Lebanon
- Maldives
- Marshall Islands
- Mauritius
- Micronesia
- Morocco
- Nauru
- Nepal
- North Korea
- North Macedonia
- Palau
- Paraguay
- Peru
- Philippines
- Samoa
- Seychelles
- Solomon Islands
- Sri Lanka
- Suriname
- Thailand
- Tonga
- Tunisia
- Uruguay
- Vanuatu
- Venezuela
- Vietnam

== Visa-free transit ==
Citizens of the following countries and territories may enter Uzbekistan without a visa for 5 days if they are transiting through the international airports of Uzbekistan and have an onward ticket to a third country:

- Albania
- Algeria
- Bhutan
- Colombia
- Costa Rica
- Dominica
- Ecuador
- Equatorial Guinea
- Fiji
- Gabon
- Guyana
- Lebanon
- Maldives
- Mauritius
- Morocco
- Nauru
- North Macedonia
- Palau
- Peru
- Philippines
- Seychelles
- South Africa
- Sri Lanka
- Suriname
- Thailand
- Tunisia
- Turkmenistan
- Uruguay
- Vietnam
- Venezuela

Transit visas are available to all nationalities for a duration of up to 72 hours, for which no invitation letter or tourist voucher is required.

== History ==
History of Visa of policy of Uzbekistan

On 2 December 2016, President of Uzbekistan Shavkat Mirziyoyev signed a decree titled "About measures for ensuring the accelerated development of tourist branch of the Republic of Uzbekistan" that envisaged the establishment of a visa-free regime for citizens of 15 countries as well as a visa-free regime for citizens of 12 countries who are older than 55. Those visitors would only be required to pay an entry fee on arrival. This is planned to be in place by 2020.

However, on 22 December 2016, a new decree was adopted by the President of Uzbekistan amending the decree from 2 December 2016, postponing the visa-free regime until 1 January 2021. The amending decree also said that the list of countries whose citizens would benefit from the visa-free access may be revised on the basis of dynamics of development of bilateral relations, the situation on the world tourism market and the current situation in the sphere of international and regional security.

Uzbekistan also plans to introduce electronic visas from 2021. Uzbekistan intends to use the electronic visa system of Azerbaijan as a model.

In December 2017, it was announced that Uzbekistan plans to introduce a simplified procedure for citizens of 25 additional countries and to abolish visas altogether for citizens of Japan, South Korea and Singapore. Visa validity period was extended to 30 days. In January 2018 it was announced that Uzbekistan plans to introduce a simplified procedure for citizens of 40 additional countries and to abolish visas altogether for citizens of five countries.

On 10 February 2018, Uzbekistan abolished visa requirements for 7 countries: Israel, Indonesia, Japan, South Korea, Malaysia, Singapore, Turkey. On 16 March 2018 Uzbekistan abolished visa requirements for citizens of Tajikistan and on 5 October 2018 visas were abolished for citizens of France.

In December 2018, it was announced that Uzbekistan and Kazakhstan plan to mutually accept visas from February 2019.

In December 2018, it was announced that Uzbekistan plans to expand visa-free access to citizens of additional 22 countries.

In January 2019, visa requirements were removed for citizens of Germany.

In February 2019, citizens of European Union countries, Andorra, Argentina, Australia, Bosnia and Herzegovina, Brazil, Brunei, Canada, Chile, Iceland, Liechtenstein, Monaco, Mongolia, Montenegro, New Zealand, Norway, San Marino, Serbia, Switzerland, Vatican became visa exempt.

In March 2019, Kazakhstan and Uzbekistan were reported as "set to launch" a joint visa program that could expand to nearby countries. All approvals are in place with only technical and equipment details to be worked out. As of October 2022 the discussions are still ongoing.

In August 2022, Uzbekistan will exempt the visa requirements for Saudi Arabia for a period of 30 days starting from January 1, 2023.

In December 2024, Uzbekistan and China signed a visa exemption agreement for holders of ordinary passports, with agreement coming into force on 1 June 2025. Additionally there were discussions on possible abolition of visas between Uzbekistan and Macau, and Hong Kong.

In April 2025, The President of Uzbekistan proposed to extend the visa-free period from 10 days to 30 days for the Kuwaiti, Omani and Bahraini citizens, as well as simplify the process of obtaining visas for tourists from India, Pakistan, Egypt and Iran. Additionally, there were discussions of visa-free agreement between Uzbekistan and Vietnam during the meeting between the President of Uzbekistan and the Chairman of the National Assembly of Vietnam.

In May 2025, it was announced that Uzbekistan is considering granting 30 days visa-free access to the US citizens in order to further boost tourism. Additionally, Uzbekistan is considering granting ID card/Internal passport entry for 30 days period to the citizens of Azerbaijan, Kazakhstan and Russia.

In August 2025, during Jordan's Kings visit to Uzbekistan it was discussed at the highest level among others the benefits of visa abolition between Jordan and Uzbekistan, to boost tourism.

In November 2025, the president of Uzbekistan signed a visa abolition order for tourist visits up to 30 days, for the citizens of the United States effective from 1 January 2026, to boost tourism, as well as, further develop the cultural and humanitarian relations between the two countries.

In August 2026, Uzbekistan introduces 30-day visa-free regime for Indian citizens during PM Modi's visit. "The introduction of a 30-day visa-free regime for Indian citizens will make a significant contribution to the development of people-to-people contacts, tourism, and business exchanges" Mirziyoyev added.

== Admission restrictions ==
Entry and transit is refused to citizens of Kosovo, even if not leaving the aircraft and proceeding by the same flight. Uzbekistan also does not recognize the passports of Abkhazia, the Sahrawi Republic, Somaliland, South Ossetia and Transnistria.

== Visitor statistics ==
=== Total visitors by year ===
| Year | Total |
|---|---|
| 1992—1994 | No data |
| 1995 | ▲92,000 |
| 1996 | ▲173,000 |
| 1997 | ▲960,000 |
| 1998 | ▼811,000 |
| 1999 | ▼487,000 |
| 2000 | ▼302,000 |
| 2001 | ▲345,000 |
| 2002 | ▼332,000 |
| 2003 | ▼231,000 |
| 2004 | ▲262,000 |
| 2005 | ▼242,000 |
| 2006 | ▲560,000 |
| 2007 | ▲903,000 |
| 2008 | ▲1,069,000 |
| 2009 | ▲1,215,000 |
| 2010 | ▼975,000 |
| 2011 | ▲1,200,000 |
| 2012 | ▲1,895,000 |
| 2013 | ▲1,968,000 |
| 2014 | ▼1,938,000 |
| 2015 | ▲2,034,253 |
| 2016 | ▲2,157,000 |
| 2017 | ▲2,847,000 |
| 2018 | ▲6,433,000 |
| 2019 | ▲6,748,512 |
| 2020 | ▼1,504,100 |
| Total (1995–2020) | More 37,125,000 |

=== Visitors by countries ===
Visitors arriving in Uzbekistan were from the following countries of nationality:

| Country | 2019 | 2018 | 2017 | 2016 | 2015 | 2014 |
|---|---|---|---|---|---|---|
| Kazakhstan | ▼2,261,094 | ▲2,456,866 | ▲1,783,815 | ▲1,412,161 | ▲1,285,008 | 1,163,984 |
| Tajikistan | ▼1,473,684 | ▲1,700,658 | ▲261,861 | ▼213,692 | ▼246,816 | 291,167 |
| Kyrgyzstan | ▲1,454,907 | ▲1,101,477 | ▲375,017 | ▲174, 845 | ▲146,332 | 119,620 |
| Turkmenistan | ▲574,795 | ▲245,756 | ▲62,483 | ▼49,526 | ▲55,060 | 44,925 |
| Russia | ▼455,470 | ▲460,166 | ▲143,900 | ▼119,049 | ▼123,153 | 124,218 |
| Turkey | ▼63,539 | ▲74,802 | ▲55,238 | ▲46,069 | ▼40,389 | 40,563 |
| (Islamic Republic of Afghanistan) Afghanistan | ▼62,580 | ▲71,067 | ▲32,130 | ▲24,365 | ▲21,995 | 21,249 |
| China | ▲54,293 | ▲37,083 | ▲19,749 | ▲16,765 | ▲16,441 | 14,818 |
| South Korea | ▲35,524 | ▼32,700 | ▲37,357 | ▲31,936 | ▼30,489 | 33,323 |
| India | ▲27,898 | ▲22,198 | ▼15,829 | ▼18,746 | ▼19,827 | 21,707 |
| Germany | ▲27,625 | ▲19,056 | ▲7,811 | ▲6,605 | ▼6,122 | 8,041 |
| Japan | ▲24,944 | ▲17,237 | ▲4,086 | ▲3,012 | ▼2,306 | 2,423 |
| France | ▲20,390 | ▲14,195 | ▲5,748 | ▲4,889 | ▼3,670 | 6,019 |
| Italy | ▲20,356 | ▲14,156 | ▲5,162 | ▲3,057 | ▼2,601 | 3,520 |
| USA | ▲17,106 | ▲12,723 | ▲1,525 | ▼1,349 | ▼1,367 | 1,454 |
| United Kingdom | ▲15,962 | ▲8,941 | ▲3,256 | ▲2,217 | ▲1,959 | 2,043 |
| Ukraine | ▼14,041 | ▲15,573 | ▲735 | ▼664 | ▼2,431 | 4,763 |
| Israel | ▲13,615 | ▲10,022 | ▲4,155 | ▼3,564 | ▲3,738 | 3,414 |
| Iran | ▲13,469 | ▲10,573 | ▼3,058 | ▼5,541 | ▼6,654 | 8,445 |
| Azerbaijan | ▲12,367 | ▲11,161 | ▲4,312 | ▼2,989 | ▼3,368 | 3,878 |
| Spain | ▲12,191 | ▲7,745 | ▲449 | ▲353 | ▼239 | 1,552 |
| Belarus | ▼7,411 | ▲16,470 | ▲3,011 | ▲1,813 | ▲1,224 | 666 |
| Pakistan | ▼5,791 | ▲6,032 | ▲3,799 | ▲424 | ▲390 | 14 |
| Poland | ▲5,132 | ▲3,147 | ▲115 | ▲182 | ▼176 | 353 |
| Moldova | ▼4,601 | ▲6,215 | ▼33 | ▼24 | ▲34 | 70 |
| Australia | ▲4,588 | ▲2,549 | ▼2 | ▼3 | ▼4 | 35 |
| Netherlands | ▲4,504 | ▲3,054 | ▲30 | ▼28 | ▼68 | 96 |
| Malaysia | ▲4,388 | ▼2,837 | ▼3,164 | ▲3,450 | ▼2,807 | 3,922 |
| Switzerland | ▲3,837 | ▲3,115 | ▲63 | ▼28 | ▼47 | 78 |
| Canada | ▲3,767 | ▲1,946 | No data | No data | No data | 3 |
| Austria | ▲3,216 | ▲2,226 | ▼29 | ▼40 | ▼97 | 138 |
| Belgium | ▲3,044 | ▲2,235 | ▲48 | ▼29 | ▼67 | 79 |
| Georgia | ▼2,916 | ▲2,990 | ▼129 | ▼177 | ▲228 | 135 |
| Indonesia | ▲2,702 | ▲1,702 | ▼1 | No data | No data | No data |
| UAE | ▲2,423 | ▼1,664 | ▼5,771 | ▲5,880 | ▲5,533 | 5,003 |
| Taiwan | ▲2,131 | ▲1,381 | ▼1 | No data | No data | 3 |
| Latvia | ▲1,933 | ▲1,478 | ▼291 | ▼256 | ▼413 | 604 |
| Singapore | ▲1,820 | ▲1,804 | ▼10 | No data | ▼2 | No data |
| Czech Republic | ▲1,804 | ▲1,547 | ▼128 | ▼44 | ▼71 | 1,942 |
| Sweden | ▲1,782 | ▲1,092 | ▲3 | No data | ▼7 | 12 |
| Armenia | ▲1,740 | ▲1,529 | ▼9 | ▼44 | ▲23 | 16 |
| Norway | ▲1,659 | ▲1,168 | No data | No data | No data | No data |
| Thailand | ▲1,637 | ▼1,260 | ▲1,987 | ▲1,459 | ▲1,414 | 1,348 |
| Denmark | ▲1,605 | ▲775 | ▼2 | No data | ▼1 | 2 |
| Philippines | ▲1,510 | ▲635 | ▲18 | No data | ▼8 | 402 |
| Lithuania | ▲1,453 | ▲873 | ▼474 | ▼524 | ▲804 | 654 |
| Saudi Arabia | ▲1,382 | ▲974 | ▼56 | ▼266 | ▲290 | 80 |
| Greece | ▲1,211 | ▲821 | ▼1 | ▼3 | ▼23 | 41 |
| Slovakia | ▲1,112 | ▲668 | ▲20 | ▼17 | ▼48 | 55 |
| Bulgaria | ▲1,064 | ▲738 | ▲17 | ▲76 | ▼28 | 64 |
| Hungary | ▲1,047 | ▲1,014 | ▲23 | ▼5 | ▼20 | 39 |
| Bangladesh | ▲1,039 | ▲448 | ▲9 | ▼6 | ▲8 | 18 |
| Statelessness | ▼1,024 | ▲2,558 | No data | No data | No data | No data |
| Finland | ▲974 | ▲635 | ▼3 | ▼16 | 20 | No data |
| Egypt | ▲923 | ▲689 | ▲4 | No data | No data | No data |
| Romania | ▲920 | ▲508 | ▲1 | No data | No data | 17 |
| Portugal | ▲916 | ▲683 | No data | No data | No data | No data |
| Estonia | ▲908 | ▲421 | ▲1 | ▼22 | 28 | |
| New Zealand | ▲809 | ▲555 | No data | ▲1 | No data | No data |
| Serbia | ▲776 | ▲654 | No data | No data | No data | No data |
| Mongolia | ▲726 | ▲269 | ▲92 | ▲66 | ▲11 | No data |
| Ireland | ▲702 | ▲414 | No data | No data | No data | No data |
| Brazil | ▲680 | ▲516 | No data | No data | No data | No data |
| Slovenia | ▲542 | ▲455 | ▲2 | ▼1 | ▼22 | 75 |
| Jordan | ▲532 | ▲354 | ▲12 | No data | No data | 30 |
| South Africa | ▲431 | ▲214 | No data | No data | No data | No data |
| Mexico | ▲421 | ▲270 | No data | No data | No data | No data |
| Vietnam | ▲414 | ▼269 | ▼433 | ▲464 | ▲237 | 56 |
| Kuwait | ▲386 | ▲302 | ▲51 | No data | ▼50 | 55 |
| Syria | ▲331 | ▲314 | No data | No data | No data | 1 |
| Argentina | ▲319 | ▲220 | No data | No data | ▲1 | No data |
| Iraq | ▲313 | ▲195 | No data | No data | No data | 7 |
| Oman | ▲296 | ▲248 | ▼9 | ▼2 | No data | 97 |
| Croatia | ▲288 | ▲245 | ▲6 | No data | No data | 3 |
| Colombia | ▲235 | ▲232 | No data | No data | No data | No data |
| Nepal | ▲230 | ▲143 | ▼7 | No data | No data | 384 |
| Nigeria | ▲216 | ▲156 | No data | No data | No data | No data |
| Morocco | ▲213 | ▲153 | No data | No data | No data | No data |
| Luxembourg | ▲174 | ▲168 | No data | No data | No data | 11 |
| Sri Lanka | ▲151 | ▼123 | No data | No data | No data | 164 |
| Chile | ▼144 | ▲149 | No data | No data | No data | No data |
| Cyprus | ▲139 | ▲77 | No data | No data | No data | 2 |
| Qatar | ▼137 | ▲174 | ▲76 | No data | No data | 40 |
| Yemen | ▲132 | ▲91 | No data | No data | No data | 18 |
| Bosnia and Herzegovina | ▲130 | ▲91 | No data | No data | No data | No data |
| Algeria | ▼120 | ▲156 | No data | No data | No data | No data |
| Tunisia | ▼115 | ▲169 | No data | No data | No data | No data |
| Bahrain | ▲111 | ▲65 | No data | No data | No data | No data |
| Palestine | ▼108 | ▲111 | No data | No data | No data | No data |
| DPRK | ▲102 | ▲49 | No data | No data | No data | No data |
| Malta | ▲98 | ▲42 | No data | No data | No data | |
| North Macedonia | ▲78 | ▲47 | No data | No data | No data | No data |
| Cameroon | ▲77 | ▲16 | No data | No data | No data | No data |
| Albania | ▲63 | ▲33 | No data | No data | No data | No data |
| Myanmar | ▲61 | ▲44 | No data | No data | No data | No data |
| Peru | ▲61 | ▲35 | No data | No data | No data | No data |
| Brunei | ▲55 | ▲15 | No data | No data | No data | No data |
| Iceland | ▲50 | ▲28 | No data | No data | No data | No data |
| Ghana | ▲49 | ▲17 | No data | No data | No data | No data |
| Sudan | ▲48 | ▲47 | No data | No data | No data | No data |
| Cambodia | ▲46 | ▲12 | No data | No data | No data | No data |
| Ethiopia | ▲45 | ▲25 | No data | No data | ▲16 | No data |
| Kenya | ▼44 | ▲65 | No data | No data | No data | No data |
| Montenegro | ▲38 | ▲25 | No data | No data | No data | No data |
| Ecuador | ▼35 | ▲36 | No data | No data | No data | No data |
| Venezuela | ▼34 | ▲100 | No data | No data | No data | No data |
| Mauritius | ▲33 | ▲17 | No data | No data | No data | No data |
| Saint Kitts and Nevis | ▲32 | ▲15 | No data | No data | No data | No data |
| Zimbabwe | ▲32 | ▲13 | No data | No data | No data | No data |
| Ivory Coast | ▲31 | ▲4 | No data | No data | No data | No data |
| Andorra | ▼29 | ▲39 | No data | No data | No data | No data |
| Comoros | ▼29 | ▲31 | No data | No data | No data | No data |
| Cuba | ▼29 | ▲35 | No data | No data | No data | No data |
| Costa Rica | ▲27 | ▲19 | No data | No data | No data | No data |
| Uruguay | ▲26 | ▲11 | No data | No data | No data | No data |
| Laos | ▲25 | ▲19 | No data | No data | No data | No data |
| Dominica | ▲24 | ▲12 | No data | No data | No data | No data |
| Bhutan | ▲21 | ▲14 | No data | No data | No data | 8 |
| Zambia | ▲21 | ▲9 | No data | No data | No data | No data |
| Senegal | ▲19 | ▲6 | No data | No data | No data | No data |
| Guinea | ▲18 | ▲11 | No data | No data | No data | No data |
| Marshall Islands | ▼18 | ▲41 | No data | No data | No data | No data |
| Bolivia | ▼17 | ▲21 | No data | No data | No data | No data |
| DRC | ▲17 | ▲10 | No data | No data | No data | No data |
| Uganda | ▲17 | ▲15 | No data | No data | No data | 1 |
| Kiribati | ▲16 | ▲2 | No data | No data | No data | No data |
| Monaco | ▲16 | ▲4 | No data | No data | No data | No data |
| Libya | ▲13 | ▲6 | No data | No data | No data | No data |
| Tanzania | ▼13 | ▲14 | No data | No data | No data | No data |
| El Salvador | ▲12 | ▲6 | No data | No data | No data | No data |
| Jamaica | ▲11 | ▲1 | No data | No data | No data | No data |
| Maldives | ▲11 | ▲8 | No data | No data | No data | No data |
| Dominican Republic | ▲10 | ▲1 | No data | No data | No data | No data |
| Paraguay | ▲10 | ▲3 | No data | No data | No data | No data |
| Honduras | ▲9 | ▲8 | No data | No data | No data | No data |
| Mali | ▲9 | ▲1 | No data | No data | No data | No data |
| São Tomé and Príncipe | ▲9 | ▲8 | No data | No data | No data | No data |
| Angola | ▲8 | ▲2 | No data | No data | No data | No data |
| Burundi | ▲8 | 0 | No data | No data | No data | No data |
| Fiji | ▲8 | ▲5 | No data | No data | No data | No data |
| Panama | ▲8 | ▲2 | No data | No data | No data | No data |
| Botswana | ▲7 | 0 | No data | No data | No data | No data |
| Nicaragua | ▲7 | ▲5 | No data | No data | No data | No data |
| Eswatini | ▲7 | 0 | No data | No data | No data | No data |
| Mauritania | ▲6 | ▲2 | No data | No data | No data | No data |
| Rwanda | ▼6 | ▲8 | No data | No data | No data | No data |
| San Marino | ▲6 | ▲2 | No data | No data | No data | No data |
| Somalia | ▲6 | ▲5 | No data | No data | No data | No data |
| Guatemala | ▼5 | ▲6 | No data | No data | No data | No data |
| Trinidad and Tobago | ▼5 | ▲8 | No data | No data | No data | No data |
| Burkina Faso | ▲4 | 0 | No data | No data | No data | No data |
| Eritrea | ▲4 | ▲3 | No data | No data | No data | No data |
| Guyana | ▲4 | ▲1 | No data | No data | No data | No data |
| Haiti | ▲4 | ▲4 | No data | No data | No data | No data |
| Namibia | ▼4 | ▲6 | No data | No data | No data | No data |
| Niger | ▲4 | ▲1 | No data | No data | No data | No data |
| Chad | ▲3 | ▲1 | No data | No data | No data | No data |
| Gambia | ▲3 | ▲3 | No data | No data | No data | No data |
| Malawi | ▲3 | ▲1 | No data | No data | No data | No data |
| Vanuatu | ▲3 | ▲1 | No data | No data | No data | No data |
| Antigua and Barbuda | ▼2 | ▲5 | No data | No data | No data | No data |
| Barbados | ▲2 | 0 | No data | No data | No data | No data |
| Djibouti | ▲2 | 0 | No data | No data | No data | No data |
| Benin | ▼2 | ▲4 | No data | No data | No data | No data |
| Gabon | ▲2 | ▲1 | No data | No data | No data | No data |
| Grenada | ▲2 | ▲1 | No data | No data | No data | No data |
| Netherlands Antilles | ▲2 | 0 | No data | No data | No data | No data |
| Togo | ▲2 | 0 | No data | No data | No data | No data |
| Tokelau | ▼2 | ▲8 | No data | No data | No data | No data |
| Turks and Caicos Islands | ▲2 | 0 | No data | No data | No data | No data |
| Bermuda | ▲1 | ▲1 | No data | No data | No data | No data |
| Cape Verde | ▲1 | 0 | No data | No data | No data | No data |
| Central African Republic | ▲1 | 0 | No data | No data | No data | No data |
| Madagascar | ▼1 | ▲3 | No data | No data | No data | No data |
| Mozambique | ▲1 | 0 | No data | No data | No data | No data |
| Saint Helena | ▲1 | 0 | No data | No data | No data | No data |
| Saint Lucia | ▲1 | 0 | No data | No data | No data | No data |
| Surinam | ▲1 | 0 | No data | No data | No data | No data |
| Vatican | ▼1 | ▲3 | No data | No data | No data | No data |
| Bahamas | ▼0 | ▲1 | No data | No data | No data | No data |
| French Polynesia | ▼0 | ▲1 | No data | No data | No data | No data |
| Nauru | ▼0 | ▲2 | No data | No data | No data | No data |
| Papua New Guinea | ▼0 | ▲1 | No data | No data | No data | No data |
| Sierra Leone | ▼0 | ▲1 | No data | No data | No data | No data |
| United States Virgin Islands | ▼0 | ▲2 | No data | No data | No data | No data |
| Total | ▲6,748,512 | ▲6,432,983 | ▲2,847,877 | ▲2,157,676 | ▲2,034,253 | ▲1,938,035 |

== See also ==
- Visa requirements for Uzbekistani citizens
