= Visa requirements for Uzbekistan citizens =

Administrative entry restrictions

Front cover of Uzbekistan international passport (started issuing January 1, 2019)

Visa requirements for Uzbek citizens are administrative entry restrictions by the authorities of other states placed on citizens of Uzbekistan. The article is concerning ordinary passport holders and tourists. As of 2026, 59 visa-free destinations and visa-on-arrival countries, as a result, ranking the Uzbekistan passport 73rd in terms of travel freedom according to the Henley Passport Index.

Uzbekistan citizens in other countries also can benefit from the mobility rights arrangements within the Commonwealth of Independent States.

== Exit visas ==
All Uzbek citizens were required to obtain an exit visa to travel to all non-CIS countries from 1995 until 2019. An exit visa was not needed for trips to CIS countries as long as the travelers did not then go to a non-CIS country. Penalties for traveling to non-CIS countries without an exit visa included heavy fines and prison terms up to 10 years in length. Exit visas were obtained from the Interior Ministry's local OVIR (Office of Visas and Registration) department, and were valid for two years.

Uzbek immigration authorities did not allow Uzbek citizens to board outbound flights without a valid visa for the destination country and/or a return ticket even if the destination country grants visa on arrival to Uzbek passport holders. As a result, Uzbek citizens had to go to the immigration counter at Tashkent International Airport for an approval and a stamp on their tickets before they proceeded to a check-in counter.

The exit visa requirement was abolished on 1 January 2019 after a presidential decree signed in August 2017 came into force.

== Changes ==
Visa requirements for Uzbekistani citizens were most recently lifted by UAE (16 February 2024), Oman (14 June 2024), China (1 June 2025) and Jordan (25 September 2025).

Timeline (expansion of visa privileges)
- No historical visa requirements: Armenia (visa-free); Azerbaijan (visa-free); Belarus (visa-free); Georgia (visa-free); Kazakhstan (visa-free); Moldova (visa-free); Russia (visa-free); Ukraine (visa-free)
- 1992: Turkey (visa-free)(Cancelled in 1999)
- 2007: Kyrgyzstan (visa-free; 12 February)(Restored)
- 2007: Turkey (visa-free; 1 August)(Restored)
- 2008: Ecuador (visa-free, 20 June)(Cancelled in 2022)
- 2014: Philippines (visa-free; 15 April)
- 2015: Indonesia (visa-free; 19 September)(Cancelled)
- 2018: Tajikistan (visa-free; 16 March) (Restored)
- 2022: Mongolia (visa-free; 3 June)
- 2022: Indonesia (Visa on Arrival; 15 September)
- 2023: Saudi Arabia (E-Visa/Visa on Arrival; 6 August)
- 2023: Qatar (visa-free; 6 October)
- 2024: Iran (visa-free; 4 February)
- 2024: UAE (visa-free; 16 February)
- 2024: Thailand (visa-free; 15 July)(Cancelled in 2026)
- 2024: Oman (visa-free; 14 June)
- 2025: China (visa-free; 1 June)
- 2025: Jordan (visa-free; 25 September)
- 2026: Taiwan (Conditional e-visa; 30 March)

== Visa requirements map ==
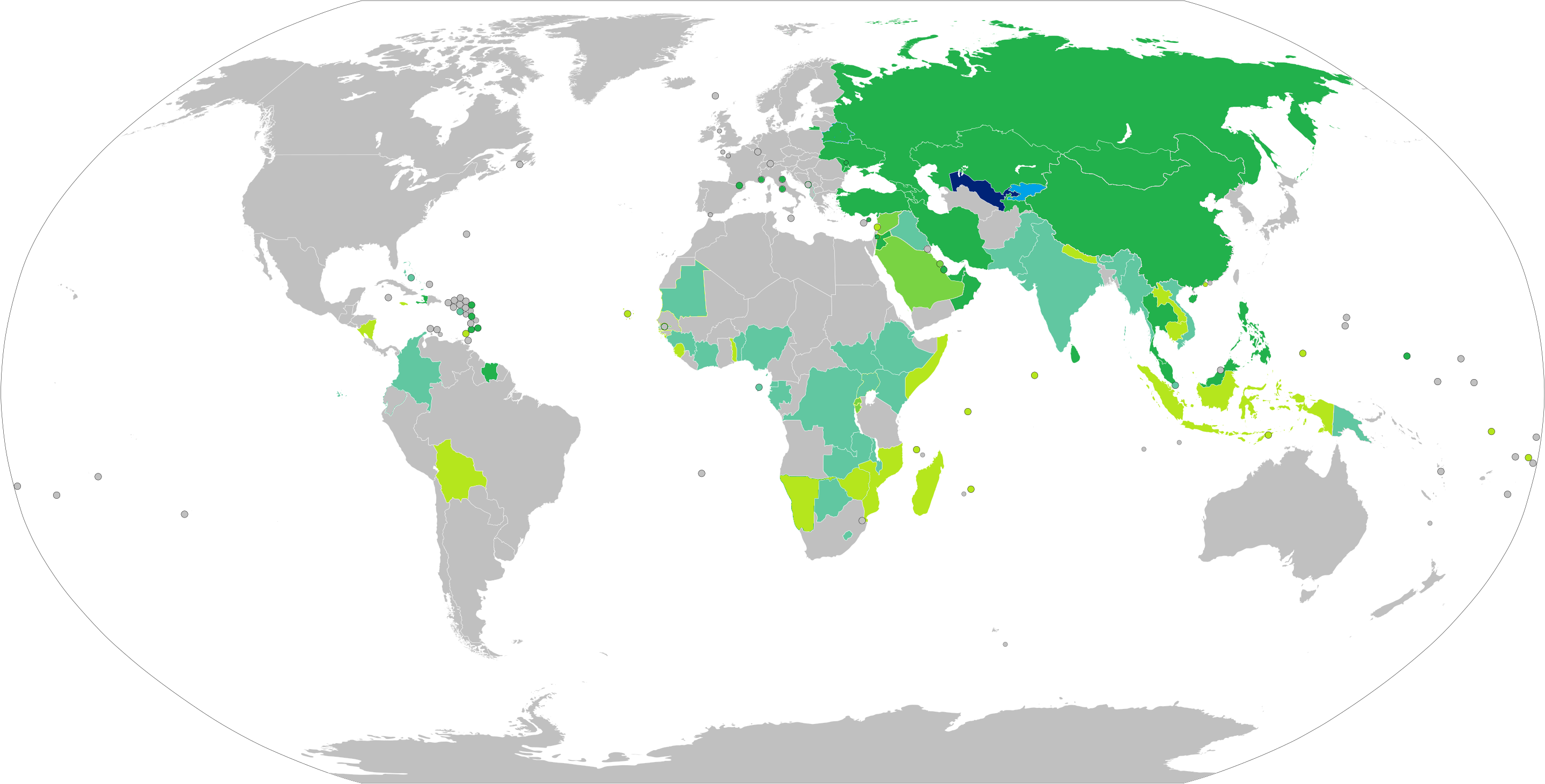
Visa requirements for Uzbekistan passport holders Uzbekistan Visa not required Visa not required, ID card travel Visa on arrival eVisa Both visa on arrival and eVisa available Visa required prior to arrival

== Visa requirements ==
Country	Visa requirement	Allowed stay	Notes (excluding departure fees)
Afghanistan	Visa required		Not eligible for the e-Visa program available to most nationalities.
Albania	eVisa		Visa is not required for Holders of a valid multiple-entry Schengen, UK or US visa has been previously used once or residence permit of Ireland, Schengen, UK, US or UAE 10 years.
Algeria	Visa required		
Andorra	Visa not required		90 days within any 365-day period.; Although officially no visa is required, at least a Double Entry Schengen visa is required to enter Andorra since it has no own airport facility.
Angola	Visa required		
Antigua and Barbuda	Visa not required	1 month	
Argentina	Visa required		
Armenia	Visa not required	180 days	
Australia	Online visa required		May apply online (Online Visitor e600 visa).
Austria	Visa required		
Azerbaijan	Visa not required	90 days	
Bahamas	eVisa		
Bahrain	eVisa / Visa on arrival		
Bangladesh	Visa required		
Barbados	Visa not required	28 days	
Belarus	Visa not required	Unlimited	
Belgium	Visa required		
Belize	Visa required		
Benin	eVisa		
Bhutan	eVisa	90 days	Visa fee is USD 40 per person and visa application may be processed within 5 business days with duration of stay of 90 days.; e-Visa applicant is also subject to pay Sustainable Development Fee
Bolivia	Visa on arrival	90 days	
Bosnia and Herzegovina	Visa required		Valid multiple entry visa holders and residents of the European Union, Schengen Area member states, and United States of America can enter Bosnia and Herzegovina without a visa for a maximum stay of 30 days.
Botswana	eVisa		
Brazil	Visa required		
Brunei	Visa required		
Bulgaria	Visa required		
Burkina Faso	eVisa		
Burundi	Visa on arrival		
Cambodia	eVisa / Visa on arrival	30 days	
Cameroon	eVisa		
Canada	Visa required		
Cape Verde	Visa on arrival		
Central African Republic	Visa required		
Chad	Visa required		
Chile	Visa required		
China	Visa not required	30 days	The duration of stay is 30 days at a time, no more than 90 days within any 180 days.
Colombia	eVisa		
Comoros	Visa on arrival		
Republic of the Congo	Visa required		
Democratic Republic of the Congo	eVisa	7 days	
Costa Rica	Visa required		
Côte d'Ivoire	eVisa		
Croatia	Visa required		
Cuba	Visa required		
Cyprus	Visa required		
Czech Republic	Visa required		
Denmark	Visa required		
Djibouti	eVisa		
Dominica	Visa not required	21 days	
Dominican Republic	Visa required		
Ecuador	eVisa	90 days	
Egypt	Visa required		
El Salvador	Visa required		
Equatorial Guinea	eVisa		
Eritrea	Visa required		
Estonia	Visa required		
Eswatini	Visa required		
Ethiopia	eVisa	90 days	
Fiji	Visa required		
Finland	Visa required		
France	Visa required		
Gabon	eVisa		
Gambia	Visa not required	28 days	
Georgia	Visa not required	365 days	
Germany	Visa required		
Ghana	Visa required		
Greece	Visa required		
Grenada	Visa on arrival	3 months	
Guatemala	Visa required		
Guinea	eVisa		
Guinea-Bissau	Visa on arrival	90 days	
Guyana	Visa required		
Haiti	Visa not required	3 months	
Honduras	Visa required		
Hong Kong	Visa required		
Hungary	Visa required		
Iceland	Visa required		
India	eVisa		e-Visa holders must arrive via 32 designated airports (Note: Ahmedabad; Amritsar; Bagdogra; Bengaluru; Bhubaneswar; Chandigarh; Chennai; Coimbatore; Delhi; Gaya; Goa-Dabolim; Goa-Manohar; Guwahati; Hyderabad; Indore; Jaipur; Kannur; Kochi; Kolkata; Kozhikode; Lucknow; Madurai; Mangaluru; Mumbai; Nagpur; Port Blair; Pune; Surat; Thiruvananthapuram; Tiruchirappalli; Varanasi; Visakhapatnam) or 5 designated seaports. (Note: Chennai; Cochin; Mormugao (Goa); Mumbai; Mangalore); An Indian e-Tourist Visa may only be obtained twice within 1 calendar year.; Foreigners of Pakistani origin or who hold a Pakistani Passport are not eligible for an e-Visa. Foreigners who are not Pakistani nationals, but whose parents or grandparents (either paternal or maternal) were born in, or were permanent residents in Pakistan, are also not eligible for an e-Visa.
Indonesia	e-VOA / Visa on arrival	30 days	
Iran	Visa not required	15 days	
Iraq	eVisa		
Ireland	Visa required		Visa waiver for UK 'C' visa holders until October 2021. Entry permitted only if first point of entry to the Common Travel Area is in the UK.
Israel	Visa required		
Italy	Visa required		
Jamaica	Visa on arrival		
Japan	Visa required		Eligible for an e-Visa if residing in one these countries Australia, Brazil, Cambodia, Canada, India, Saudi Arabia, Singapore, South Africa, Taiwan, United Arab Emirates, United Kingdom, United States.; May apply online
Jordan	Visa not required	30 days	
Kazakhstan	Visa not required	30 days	
Kenya	Electronic Travel Authorisation	3 months	Applications can be submitted up to 90 days prior to travel and must be submitted at least 3 days in advance.; eTA fee is 32.50 USD.; Proof of reservation at the hotel where visitors plan to stay is required (if staying with friends, an invitation letter is also acceptable).; Yellow fever vaccination certificate is required if coming from endemic countries.
Kiribati	Visa required		
North Korea	Visa required		
South Korea	Visa required		Multiple-Entry Visa may be granted to whom entered South Korea 4 or more times within the last 2 years, or 10 or more visits in total (one of those 10 visits should be within the last 2 years).; May apply online
Kuwait	Visa required		e-Visa can be obtained for holders of a Residence Permit issued by a GCC member state under the following conditions: To be 18 years old and over.; The residence permit for a GCC state must be valid for at least another 3 months.; To be accompanied by the sponsor of the residence permit if the sponsor is an individual.; Does not apply to holders of a GCC Student Visa and Non-Skilled Worker Visa
Kyrgyzstan	Visa not required	60 days	May enter with ID Card
Laos	Visa on arrival	30 days	18 (Note: Savannakhet Airport; Lanetoui - Mengkang (China); Meuangmom - Wan Pong (Myanmar); Banvang - Ban Khok Phai (Thailand); Namngeun - Huay Kon (Thailand); Paksan - Bueng Kan (Thailand); Paktaphan - Pak Saeng (Thailand); Pangmon - Ban Huak (Thailand); Phoudou (Thailand); Dak ta ock - Nam Giang (Vietnam); La Lai (Vietnam); Namkan (Vietnam); Namphao - Cau Treo (Vietnam); Namsoy - Na Meo (Vietnam); Naphao - Cha Lo (Vietnam); Pahang - Long Sap (Vietnam); Panghok - Tây Trang (Vietnam); Phoukeua - Bo Y (Vietnam)) of the 33 border crossings are only open to regular visa holders.; e-Visa may be used to enter Laos through the Luang Prabang, Pakse and Vientiane international airports, 3 Thai-Lao Friendship Bridges (Note: Vientiane (Friendship Bridge 1); Savannakhet (Friendship Bridge 2); Bokeo (Friendship Bridge 4)), in Boten (road and railroad), and in Vientiane (at Khamsavath railway station).; Visa on arrival is available at the Luang Prabang, Pakse and Vientiane international airports, 4 Thai-Lao Friendship Bridges (Note: Vientiane (Friendship Bridge 1); Savannakhet (Friendship Bridge 2); Khammouane (Friendship Bridge 3); Bokeo (Friendship Bridge 4)) and 7 border crossings. (Note: Nongnokkheane - Trapeang Kriel (Cambodia); Boten - Bo han (China); Golden Triangle/Samliemkham (Thailand); Khamsavath railway station (Thailand); Namheuang - Ban Na Kraseng (Thailand); Vang tao - Chongmek (Thailand); Dansavan - Lao Bảo (Vietnam))
Latvia	Visa required		
Lebanon	Free visa on arrival	1 month	1 month extendable for 2 additional months; Granted free of charge at Beirut International Airport or any other port of entry if there is no Israeli visa or seal, holding a telephone number, an address in Lebanon, and a non refundable return or circle trip ticket.
Lesotho	eVisa		
Liberia	Visa required		Must apply online for the visa on arrival.
Libya	eVisa		
Liechtenstein	Visa required		
Lithuania	Visa required		
Luxembourg	Visa required		
Macau	Visa on arrival		
Madagascar	eVisa / Visa on arrival	90 days	
Malawi	eVisa		
Malaysia	Visa not required	30 days	
Maldives	Free visa on arrival	30 days	
Mali	Visa required		
Malta	Visa required		
Marshall Islands	Visa required		
Mauritania	eVisa		Available at Nouakchott–Oumtounsy International Airport.
Mauritius	Visa on arrival	60 days	
Mexico	Visa required		Holders of permanent residence permit in the United States or Canada (Green Card and Permanent Resident Card holders, respectively) can make business and tourist trips to Mexico without visas if the duration of the trip does not exceed 6 months. At the point of entry into Mexico, they fill out only the FMTTV form and present a valid Uzbek passport and permanent resident card of the United States or Canada.
Micronesia	Visa not required	30 days	
Moldova	Visa not required	90 days	90 days within any 180 day period
Monaco	Visa required		
Mongolia	Visa not required	30 days	
Montenegro	Visa required		Visa not required for holders of a valid Australia, Japan, Canada, New Zealand, Ireland, US, UK or a Schengen Visa.; Holders of residence permit in the United Arab Emirates may enter, in Montenegro for a duration of 10 days
Morocco	Visa required		May apply for an e-Visa if holding a valid visa or a residency document issued by one of the following countries: Schengen Area, Australia, Canada, Ireland, New Zealand, United Kingdom, United States a residency document issued by Cyprus, Japan, United Arab Emirates.
Mozambique	eVisa / Visa on arrival	30 days	
Myanmar	eVisa	28 days	eVisa holders must arrive via Yangon, Nay Pyi Taw or Mandalay airports or via land border crossings with Thailand — Tachileik, Myawaddy and Kawthaung or India — Rih Khaw Dar and Tamu.; eVisa is available for tourism only.
Namibia	Visa on Arrival	30 days	Cost N$1600 - 88$
Nauru	Visa required		
Nepal	eVisa / Visa on arrival	90 days	
Netherlands	Visa required		
New Zealand	Visa required		Diplomatic, service and standard passports with the former USSR symbol issued in Uzbekistan are unacceptable, and visas will not be endorsed in them.; Holders of an Australian Permanent Resident Visa or Resident Return Visa may be granted a New Zealand Resident Visa on arrival permitting indefinite stay (pursuant to the Trans-Tasman Travel Arrangement), subject to meeting character requirements and obtaining an Electronic Travel Authority prior to departure.
Nicaragua	Visa on arrival	90 days	
Niger	Visa required		
Nigeria	eVisa		
North Macedonia	Visa required		Visa is not required for stays upto 15 days if holding a valid multiple entry visa of Canada, the United States, United Kingdom, Schengen Area member state, or residence permit of Schengen Area member state.
Norway	Visa required		The Norwegian authorities do not require a visa for entry to Svalbard, but if you are required to have a visa to Norway/Schengen, you must have a visa if you travel via Norway/Schengen on your way to or from Svalbard. It is important to ensure that you get permission for two entries in your visa in order to be able to return to the Schengen area (mainland Norway) after your stay in Svalbard.
Oman	Visa not required	14 days	Holders of a GCC state resident permit can get a 28 days visa on arrival that costs 5 Omani Riyals.
Pakistan	eVisa		
Palau	Free visa on arrival	30 days	
Panama	Visa required		Visa is not required for holders of a multiple-entry visa valid for at least 6 months at the time of entry or permanent residency issued by Australia, Canada, European Union, Japan, Singapore, South Korea, US, UK.
Papua New Guinea	eVisa		May apply for an e-visa under the type of "Tourist - Own Itinerary".
Paraguay	Visa required		
Peru	Visa required		
Philippines	Visa not required	30 days	
Poland	Visa required		
Portugal	Visa required		
Qatar	Visa not required	30 days	
Romania	Visa required		
Russia	Visa not required	90 days	90 days within one calendar year period
Rwanda	Visa on arrival	30 days	Can also be entered on an East Africa tourist visa issued by Kenya or Uganda
Saint Kitts and Nevis	eVisa		Visa obtainable online.
Saint Lucia	Visa required		
Saint Vincent and the Grenadines	Visa not required	1 month	
Samoa	Visa not required	60 days	
San Marino	Visa required		
São Tomé and Príncipe	eVisa		
Saudi Arabia	eVisa / Visa on arrival		
Senegal	Visa on arrival		
Serbia	Visa required		
Seychelles	Free Visitor’s Permit on arrival	3 months	
Sierra Leone	Visa on arrival		
Singapore	eVisa		96 hour Transit Visa can be obtained on arrival provided that holding confirmed onward plane tickets to a third country and a visa for the third country, passport validity for 6 months and in flights departing within 96 hours.
Slovakia	Visa required		
Slovenia	Visa required		
Solomon Islands	Visa required		Visa on arrival if holding pre-arranged visa
Somalia	eVisa	30 days	All visitors must have an approved Electronic Visa (eTAS) before the start of their journey.
South Africa	ETA		
South Sudan	eVisa		Obtainable online; Printed visa authorization must be presented at the time of travel
Spain	Visa required		
Sri Lanka	ETA / Visa on arrival	30 days	Electronic Travel Authorization can also be obtained on arrival.; 30 days extendable to 6 months.; The standard visitor visa allows a stay of 60 days within any 6-month period.; Visa fees (for Standard visitor visa): SAARC - USD 35; Non SAARC - USD 75; e-Visa categories will be charged an additional USD 18.50 service fee.; If transiting from any of the Sri Lankan airports, An e-Visa is exempted (2 day transit period).
Sudan	Visa required		
Suriname	eVisa		
Sweden	Visa required		
Switzerland	Visa required		
Syria	eVisa		
Tajikistan	Visa not required	30 days	
Tanzania	eVisa required		
Thailand	Visa required	60 days	Thailand launched digital arrival card(TDAC) for visitors starting from May st 2025 that could be filled up to 3 days before the arrival date. Thailand cancelled visa free regime for Uzbekistan starting from September 15, 2026
Timor-Leste	Visa on arrival	30 days	
Togo	eVisa	15 days	
Tonga	Visa required		
Trinidad and Tobago	eVisa		
Tunisia	Visa required		Visa not required for tourist groups organised by a travel agency.
Turkey	Visa not required	90 days	90 days within any 180 day period
Turkmenistan	Visa required		
Tuvalu	Visa on arrival	1 month	
Uganda	eVisa / Visa on arrival		May apply online.; Visa fee is 50 USD.; Can also be entered on an East Africa Tourist Visa issued by Kenya or Rwanda.
Ukraine	Visa not required	90 days	90 days within any 180 day period
United Arab Emirates	Visa not required	30 days	
United Kingdom	Visa required		
United States	Visa required		
Uruguay	Visa required		
Vanuatu	eVisa		
Vatican City	Visa required		
Venezuela	eVisa		Introduction of Electronic Visa System for Tourist and Business Travelers.
Vietnam	eVisa	90 days	Visa free for 30 days when visiting Phú Quốc
Yemen	Visa required		
Zambia	eVisa	30 days	
Zimbabwe	eVisa / Visa on arrival	30 days	

=== Dependent, disputed, or restricted territories ===
Country	Visa requirement	Allowed stay	Notes (excluding departure fees)
Cook Islands	Visa not required		
Niue	Visa not required		

== See also ==
- Visa policy of Uzbekistan
- Uzbekistan passport
