= Uzbekistan nationality law =

Citizenship Act of the Republic of Uzbekistan

Supreme Council of Uzbekistan
- Long title: Law of the Republic of Uzbekistan "On Citizenship of the Republic of Uzbekistan"
- Passed by: Supreme Council of Uzbekistan
- Passed: 13 March 2020
- Signed: 13 March 2020
- Commenced: 14 March 2020

Legislative history
- Bill title: No. ZRU-610
- Status: Current legislation

The nationality law of Uzbekistan defines the status of citizens of the Republic of Uzbekistan. The current legal framework is based on the Constitution of Uzbekistan and the Law "On Citizenship of the Republic of Uzbekistan. (No. ZRU-610), which was signed on March 13, 2020.

== History ==
Following independence in 1991, Uzbekistan adopted its first citizenship law in 1992. In 2020, President Shavkat Mirziyoyev introduced updated legislation to resolve the status of thousands of long-term residents. This reform allowed roughly 50,000 stateless people who had lived in the country since before 1995 to obtain citizenship through a simplified process.

== Acquisition of citizenship ==
Citizenship is primarily determined by the nationality of the parents (jus sanguinis).

=== By birth ===
A child becomes an Uzbekistani citizen at birth if at least one parent is a citizen. A child born in Uzbekistan to parents who are both foreign citizens does not automatically receive citizenship; they typically follow the nationality of their parents.

=== By naturalization ===
Foreigners can apply for citizenship after five years of continuous legal residence. Requirements include a legal source of income and a basic knowledge of the Uzbek language. Applicants must also renounce any previous foreign citizenship.

== Dual citizenship ==
Uzbekistan does not recognize multiple citizenship. Under the 2020 Law, an Uzbekistani citizen is not recognized as a citizen of a foreign state while holding their Uzbek nationality. Acquiring a foreign passport is grounds for losing Uzbekistani citizenship.

== Loss of citizenship ==
According to the 2020 Law, citizenship of the Republic of Uzbekistan may be terminated under the following circumstances:

- Voluntary renunciation: A citizen may voluntarily withdraw from citizenship by submitting a formal petition to the President of Uzbekistan, provided they have no unfulfilled obligations to the state.
- Loss by default: Citizenship is lost if an individual enters into the military service, security service, or police of a foreign state.
- Fraudulent acquisition: Citizenship may be revoked if it was acquired through the submission of knowingly false information or forged documents.
- Consular negligence: A citizen permanently residing abroad may lose citizenship if they fail to register with a consular institution of Uzbekistan within seven years without a valid reason.

== Statelessness and 2020 reforms ==
In March 2020, President Shavkat Mirziyoyev signed a decree that significantly reduced statelessness in the country. The new law granted automatic citizenship to registered stateless persons who had arrived in Uzbekistan before January 1, 1995, and had successfully maintained continuous residence. This move resolved the legal status of approximately 50,000 ethnic Uzbeks and other minorities.
