= The Passport Index =

Online comparative tool for passports

- Website type: Service
- Owner: Arton Capital
- Website: www.passportindex.org
- Launched: 2014; 12 years ago

The Passport Index is an interactive online tool by Arton Capital that provides its users with insights about passports, including the ability to compare and rank the world's passports. Rankings are based on the freedom of movement and visa-free travel open to holders of particular passports. The site allows the display of various territories' passports using a variety of filters such as region and passport cover colour.

== World Openness Score ==
The World Openness Score is a measure or index that tracks the ability of the world's population to travel visa-free. It grew from 17,904 to 20,143 between 2015 and August 2018. But due to the COVID-19 pandemic in 2020, the index fell to about 13,000. Despite the COVID-19 pandemic, it rose again. In 2022, the index was nearly 22,000.

== Methodology ==
The Passport Index compares passports mainly on their visa-free travel options, but also on how welcoming the countries are to visiting foreigners. In its ranking, The Passport Index looks at 193 United Nations member countries and six territories, which include ROC Taiwan, Macao (SAR China), Hong Kong (SAR China), Kosovo, Palestinian Territory and the Vatican. Territories annexed to other countries such as Norfolk Island (Australia), French Polynesia (France), British Virgin Islands (Britain) are excluded.

=== Visa-free Score ===
The Passport Index ranks passports based on a "total visa-free score," which assigns passports a point for each country their holders can visit without a visa, with a visa on arrival or by obtaining electronic travel authorization (ETA). The country with the highest visa-free score has the most powerful passport.

=== Welcoming Score ===
The Passport Index awards one point to each country's passport which allows its bearer to enter visa-free or with visa on arrival. The country with the highest welcoming score is the most welcoming country in the world.

=== World Openness Score ===
The World Openness Score is a measure that reflects the travel openness between countries. It has grown from 17,904 to 18,680 between 2015 and August 2017. On 21 November 2018 it had reached 20,189.

=== Global Mobility Score ===
The Global Mobility Score is a benchmark that shows an individual's level of freedom of global mobility reflecting one or more passports in their possession. Higher scores reflect increased freedom of mobility.

== Ranking ==
- Global Passport Power Rank: World's passports are ranked by their total visa-free score. Countries that share equal visa-free scores, are sorted by the number of visa-free countries portion of that score.
- Individual Passport Power Rank: Data from the latest UN Human Development Index is used to further break the ties and order the countries in unique ranks.
- Welcoming Countries Rank: The Passport Index ranks countries by how welcoming they are to other nationalities.

== Results ==
Passport Index rankings are in real-time and continue to vary as new changes to visa agreements are made. For the most part, the Top 10 places have been occupied by European countries with the exception of Singapore and the United Arab Emirates.

Between 2017 and 2018, at top of the list with a visa-free score of 165 were Singapore and Germany, while the United States of America, South Korea, France, Denmark and Sweden were among the 11 countries that shared the second spot with a score of 164. The UAE passport now takes first place with a visa-free score of 181, in 2026.

== Table ==
Passport scores and rankings for the year 2026.

Country	Score	Rank
United Arab Emirates	182	1
Singapore	175	2
Spain	175	2
Belgium	174	3
Luxembourg	174	3
France	174	3
Denmark	174	3
Germany	174	3
Sweden	174	3
Netherlands	174	3
Finland	174	3
Italy	174	3
Switzerland	174	3
Greece	174	3
Portugal	174	3
Austria	174	3
Malaysia	174	3
Norway	174	3
Malta	173	4
Poland	173	4
Hungary	173	4
Latvia	173	4
Ireland	173	4
South Korea	173	4
Japan	173	4
Romania	172	5
Slovenia	172	5
Czech Republic	172	5
Croatia	172	5
Slovakia	172	5
Bulgaria	172	5
Estonia	172	5
Cyprus	171	6
Lithuania	171	6
Liechtenstein	170	7
New Zealand	170	7
United Kingdom	169	8
Canada	169	8
Iceland	169	8
Australia	169	8
United States	168	9
Monaco	168	9
Hong Kong	164	10
Brazil	163	11
Argentina	161	12
Chile	160	13
Andorra	160	13
San Marino	159	14
Barbados	155	15
Brunei	154	16
Israel	153	17
Bahamas	153	17
Uruguay	151	18
Mexico	150	19
Vatican City	150	19
Saint Kitts and Nevis	147	20
Seychelles	147	20
Peru	147	20
Saint Vincent and the Grenadines	146	21
Antigua and Barbuda	144	22
Costa Rica	143	23
Ukraine	143	23
Macau	142	24
Paraguay	142	24
Trinidad and Tobago	141	25
Mauritius	140	26
Grenada	140	26
Saint Lucia	139	27
Panama	139	27
Solomon Islands	137	28
Dominica	136	29
Colombia	135	30
Serbia	133	31
El Salvador	131	32
Guatemala	131	32
North Macedonia	131	32
Georgia	131	32
Montenegro	130	33
Samoa	129	34
Honduras	129	34
Kiribati	128	35
Tuvalu	127	36
Taiwan	127	36
Marshall Islands	127	36
Tonga	126	37
Russia	123	38
Albania	123	38
Bosnia and Herzegovina	123	38
Moldova	123	38
Nicaragua	123	38
Venezuela	123	38
Turkey	121	39
Federated States of Micronesia	121	39
Palau	121	39
Qatar	119	40
Kuwait	111	41
South Africa	109	42
Timor-Leste	103	43
Belize	102	44
Maldives	102	44
Saudi Arabia	101	45
Ecuador	101	45
Bahrain	99	46
Jamaica	98	47
Fiji	98	47
Guyana	96	48
Thailand	95	49
Oman	94	50
Vanuatu	94	50
Kosovo	92	51
China	92	51
Belarus	91	52
Kazakhstan	90	53
Indonesia	89	54
Bolivia	89	54
Nauru	87	55
Papua New Guinea	87	55
Suriname	86	56
Botswana	83	57
Morocco	83	57
Azerbaijan	82	58
Dominican Republic	82	58
Lesotho	80	59
Armenia	80	59
Eswatini	79	60
Namibia	79	60
Mongolia	79	60
Philippines	78	61
Malawi	77	62
Kenya	77	62
Tanzania	74	63
Cape Verde	74	63
Tunisia	74	63
Ghana	73	64
Zambia	73	64
Gambia	72	65
Rwanda	72	65
Cuba	72	65
Kyrgyzstan	72	65
India	72	65
Uganda	71	66
Uzbekistan	71	66
São Tomé and Príncipe	71	66
Zimbabwe	69	67
Vietnam	69	67
Benin	68	68
Mozambique	68	68
Gabon	68	68
Madagascar	68	68
Sierra Leone	67	69
Tajikistan	67	69
Algeria	66	70
Cambodia	66	70
Senegal	65	71
Burkina Faso	65	71
Equatorial Guinea	65	71
Togo	64	72
Ivory Coast	64	72
Angola	64	72
Niger	63	73
Mauritania	63	73
Bhutan	63	73
Laos	62	74
Jordan	62	74
Mali	61	75
Guinea	61	75
Egypt	61	75
Comoros	61	75
Haiti	60	76
Turkmenistan	60	76
Central African Republic	59	77
Djibouti	59	77
Guinea-Bissau	58	78
Liberia	58	78
Chad	58	78
Republic of the Congo	57	79
Cameroon	57	79
Burundi	57	79
Sri Lanka	55	80
Lebanon	55	80
Myanmar	55	80
Democratic Republic of the Congo	53	81
Nepal	53	81
Nigeria	52	82
Ethiopia	52	82
Libya	51	83
Iran	51	83
Sudan	51	83
South Sudan	49	84
Eritrea	49	84
North Korea	48	85
Bangladesh	47	86
Palestine	47	86
Yemen	45	87
Somalia	43	88
Pakistan	42	89
Iraq	41	90
Syria	36	91
Afghanistan	35	92

== Case studies ==
=== United Arab Emirates ===
In 2017, The Passport Index was assigned to monitor the development of the newly launched UAE Passport Force Initiative, with the aim to position the Emirati passport on the list of the five most powerful passports in the world by 2021. By 31 October 2018, the Emirati passport had already reached fourth place.

However in 2021, the passport's power trend dropped secondary to the COVID pandemic.

== Background ==
The Passport Index was launched by Arton Capital, a financial services firm with a head office in Montreal, Canada, in 2014.

== See also ==
- Henley Passport Index
