= Visa requirements for Zambian citizens =

Administrative entry restrictions

Visa requirements for Zambian citizens are administrative entry restrictions by the authorities of other states placed on citizens of Zambia. As of 2026, Zambian citizens had visa-free or visa on arrival access to 64 countries and territories, its ranked 69th according to the Henley Passport Index and It is ranked 64th by the Global Passport Power Rank.

== Visa requirements map ==
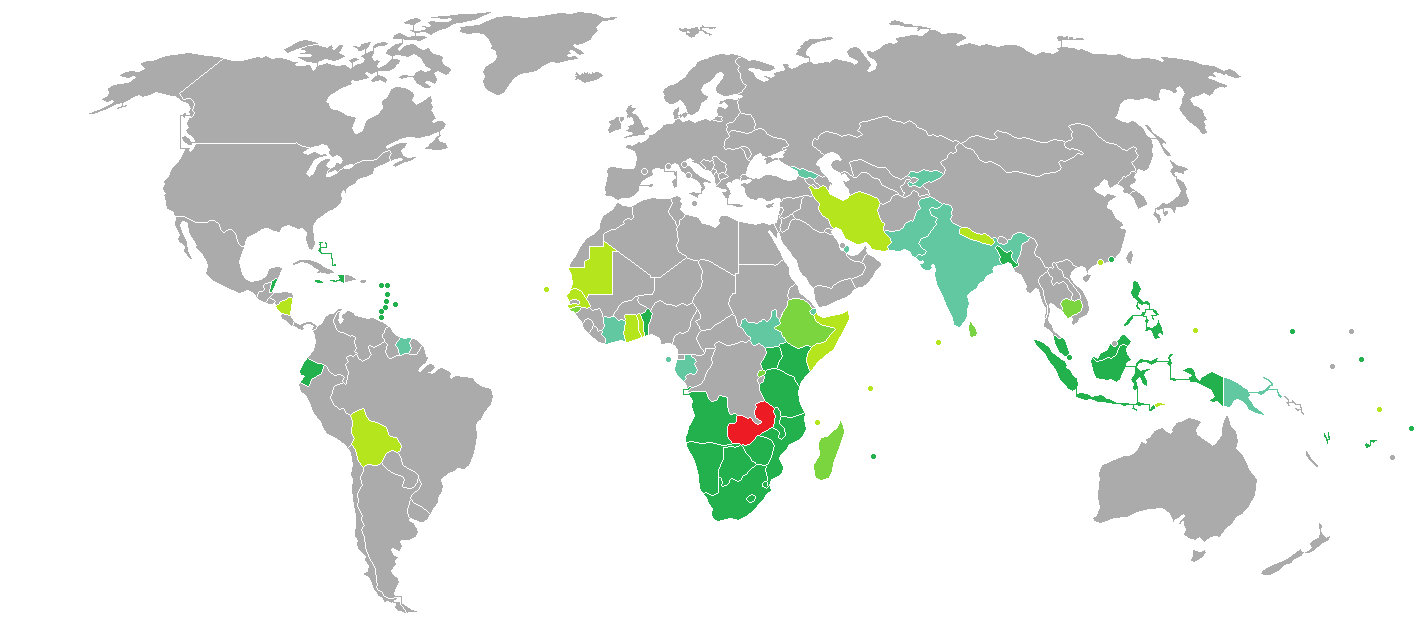
Zambia Visa not required Visa obtainable on arrival eVisa Visa available both on arrival or online Pre-arrival visa required

== Visa requirements ==
| Country | Visa requirement | Allowed stay | Notes (excluding departure fees) |
|---|---|---|---|
| Afghanistan | eVisa | 30 days | Visa is not required in case born in Afghanistan or can proof that one of their parents is a national of Afghanistan or born in Afghanistan.; e-Visa : Visitors must arrive at Kabul International (KBL). |
| Albania | eVisa | | 90 days visa free if hold a valid, multiple-entry and previously used visa or a residence permit issued by a Schengen area country, the United States, Cyprus, Ireland or the United Kingdom |
| Algeria | Visa required | | |
| Andorra | Visa required | | Andorra has not impose visa requirement, however visitors can only access Andorra via France or Spain, thus multiple entries Schengen visa is required |
| Angola | Visa not required | 90 days | |
| Antigua and Barbuda | Visa not required | 6 months | |
| Argentina | Visa required | | An Electronic Authorization (AVE or ETA) option is available for valid visa holders of the United States. |
| Armenia | Visa required | | |
| Australia and territories | Visa required | | May apply online (Online Visitor e600 visa). |
| Austria | Visa required | | |
| Azerbaijan | Visa required | | |
| Bahamas | Visa not required | 3 months | |
| Bahrain | eVisa /visa on arrival | 14 days | |
| Bangladesh | Visa not required | 90 days | |
| Barbados | Visa not required | 6 months | |
| Belarus | Visa required | | |
| Belgium | Visa required | | |
| Belize | Visa not required | | |
| Benin | Visa not required | 90 days | |
| Bhutan | eVisa | | Must pay 100 USD per person per day for Sustainable Development Fee |
| Bolivia | eVisa / Visa on arrival | 90 days | |
| Bosnia and Herzegovina | Visa required | | 30 days visa free if hold a valid multiple entry visa holders and residents of Cyprus, the Republic of Ireland, Schengen Area member states, and United States of America |
| Botswana | Visa not required | 90 days | |
| Brazil | Visa required | | |
| Brunei | Visa required | | |
| Bulgaria | Visa required | | |
| Burkina Faso | eVisa | 1 month | |
| Burundi | Visa on arrival | | |
| Cambodia | eVisa / Visa on arrival | 30 days | |
| Cameroon | eVisa | | |
| Canada | Visa required | | |
| Cape Verde | Visa on arrival | | |
| Central African Republic | Visa required | | |
| Chad | eVisa | | |
| Chile | Visa required | | |
| China | Visa required | | |
| Colombia | eVisa | | May apply online. |
| Comoros | Visa on arrival | 45 days | |
| Republic of the Congo | Visa required | | |
| Democratic Republic of the Congo | eVisa | 7 days | |
| Costa Rica | Visa required | | 90 days visa free if hold a valid, multiple-entry visa or residence permit issued by the European Union member state, European Free Trade Association member state, Canada, the United Kingdom, the United States |
| Côte d'Ivoire | eVisa | 90 days | Must arrive via Port Bouet Airport |
| Croatia | Visa required | | |
| Cuba | eVisa | 90 days | Tourist card must be obtained in advance via travel agency, airline or at the embassy.; Can be extended up to another 90 days with a fee |
| Cyprus | Visa required | | |
| Czech Republic | Visa required | | |
| Denmark | Visa required | | |
| Djibouti | eVisa | 31 days | |
| Dominica | Visa not required | 6 months | |
| Dominican Republic | Visa required | | 30 days visa free if hold a valid visa or residence card of any member state of the Schengen Area, Canada, Cyprus, Ireland, the United Kingdom or the United States |
| Ecuador | Visa not required | 90 days | |
| Egypt | Visa required | | |
| El Salvador | Visa required | | 180 days visa free if hold a valid visa issued by Canada, the United States or a Schengen member state |
| Equatorial Guinea | eVisa | | Must arrive via Malabo International Airport, processing fee 75 USD |
| Eritrea | Visa required | | |
| Estonia | Visa required | | |
| Eswatini | Visa not required | 30 days | |
| Ethiopia | eVisa / Visa on arrival | up to 90 days | Visa on arrival is obtainable only at Addis Ababa Bole International Airport.; e-Visa holders must arrive via Addis Ababa Bole International Airport.; e-Visa is available for 30 or 90 days. |
| Fiji | Visa not required | 4 months | |
| Finland | Visa required | | |
| France | Visa required | | |
| Gabon | eVisa | | Electronic visa holders must arrive via Libreville International Airport. |
| Gambia | Visa not required | 90 days | |
| Georgia | eVisa | 30 days | 30 days within any 120 days period |
| Germany | Visa required | | |
| Ghana | Visa on arrival | 30 days | |
| Greece | Visa required | | |
| Grenada | Visa not required | 3 months | |
| Guatemala | Visa required | | 90 days visa free if hold a valid visa issued by Canada, the United States or a Schengen member state |
| Guinea | eVisa | 90 days | |
| Guinea-Bissau | eVisa / Visa on arrival | 90 days | |
| Guyana | Visa required | | |
| Haiti | Visa not required | 3 months | |
| Honduras | Visa required | | 90 days visa free if hold a valid visa issued by Canada, the United States or a Schengen member state |
| Hungary | Visa required | | |
| Iceland | Visa required | | |
| India | e-Visa | 60 days | e-Visa holders must arrive via 32 designated airports (Note: Ahmedabad; Amritsar; Bagdogra; Bengaluru; Bhubaneswar; Chandigarh; Chennai; Coimbatore; Delhi; Gaya; Goa-Dabolim; Goa-Manohar; Guwahati; Hyderabad; Indore; Jaipur; Kannur; Kochi; Kolkata; Kozhikode; Lucknow; Madurai; Mangaluru; Mumbai; Nagpur; Port Blair; Pune; Surat; Thiruvananthapuram; Tiruchirappalli; Varanasi; Visakhapatnam) or 5 designated seaports. (Note: Chennai; Cochin; Mormugao (Goa); Mumbai; Mangalore); An Indian e-Tourist Visa may only be obtained twice within 1 calendar year.; Foreigners of Pakistani origin or who hold a Pakistani Passport are not eligible for an e-Visa. Foreigners who are not Pakistani nationals, but whose parents or grandparents (either paternal or maternal) were born in, or were permanent residents in Pakistan, are also not eligible for an e-Visa. |
| Indonesia | Visa required | | |
| Iran | eVisa | 30 days | Can be extended up to 90 day |
| Iraq | eVisa | | |
| Ireland | Visa required | | Exempt from paying a fee |
| Israel | Visa required | | |
| Italy | Visa required | | |
| Jamaica | Visa not required | | |
| Japan | Visa required | | |
| Jordan | Visa required | | |
| Kazakhstan | eVisa | | must arrive via Nursultan Nazarbayev International Airport or Almaty International Airport |
| Kenya | Visa not required | 3 months | |
| Kiribati | Visa not required | 90 days | 90 days within any calendar year period |
| North Korea | Visa required | | |
| South Korea | Visa required | | |
| Kuwait | Visa required | | |
| Kyrgyzstan | eVisa | 30 days or 60 days | must arrive via Manas or Osh airports or through land crossings with China (at Irkeshtam and Torugart), Kazakhstan (at Ak-jol, Ak-Tilek, Chaldybar, Chon-Kapka), Tajikistan (at Bor-Dobo, Kulundu, Kyzyl-Bel) and Uzbekistan (at Dostuk, north of Osh). |
| Laos | Visa required | | |
| Latvia | Visa required | | |
| Lebanon | Visa required | | In addition to a visa, an approval should be obtained from the Immigration department of the General Directorate for General Security (La Surete Generale). |
| Lesotho | Visa not required | 90 days | |
| Liberia | Visa required | | |
| Libya | eVisa | 30 days | |
| Liechtenstein | Visa required | | |
| Lithuania | Visa required | | |
| Luxembourg | Visa required | | |
| Madagascar | eVisa / Visa on arrival | 90 days | |
| Malawi | Visa not required | 90 days | |
| Malaysia | Visa not required | 30 days | |
| Maldives | Free visa on arrival | 30 days | |
| Mali | Visa required | | |
| Malta | Visa required | | |
| Marshall Islands | Visa required | | |
| Mauritania | eVisa | | |
| Mauritius | Visa not required | 180 days | 180 days per calendar year for tourism, 120 days per calendar year for business |
| Mexico | Visa required | | 180 days visa free if hold a permanent residence or a valid visa issued by Canada, Schengen Area, Japan, the United States or the United Kingdom and only a permanent residence issued by Chile or Colombia |
| Micronesia | Visa not required | 30 days | |
| Moldova | Visa required | | 90 days visa free if hold a valid residence permit, a valid 'C'-type, or a valid 'D'-type visa issued by a Schengen member state or a European Union member state |
| Monaco | Visa required | | |
| Mongolia | eVisa | | |
| Montenegro | Visa required | | 30 days visa free if Holde valid foreign travel documents containing a valid visa issued by the Schengen Area, Australia, Japan, Canada, New Zealand, Ireland, the United States and the United Kingdom |
| Morocco | Visa required | | May apply for an e-Visa if holding a valid visa or a residency document issued by one of the following countries: Schengen Area, Australia, Canada, Ireland, New Zealand, United Kingdom, United States a residency document issued by Cyprus, Japan, United Arab Emirates. |
| Mozambique | Visa not required | 3 months | |
| Myanmar | Visa required | | |
| Namibia | Visa not required | 3 months | |
| Nauru | Visa required | | |
| Nepal | Visa on arrival / eVisa | 90 days | |
| Netherlands | Visa required | | |
| New Zealand | Visa required | | Holders of an Australian Permanent Resident Visa or Resident Return Visa may be granted a New Zealand Resident Visa on arrival permitting indefinite stay (pursuant to the Trans-Tasman Travel Arrangement), subject to meeting character requirements and obtaining an Electronic Travel Authority prior to departure. |
| Nicaragua | Visa on arrival | 90 days | |
| Niger | Visa required | | |
| Nigeria | Visa on arrival | | |
| North Macedonia | Visa required | | 15 days visa free if hold a valid Type "C" multiple-entry visa for the Schengen Area or a temporary/permanent residence permit of an EU Member State or a country signatory of the Schengen Agreement |
| Norway | Visa required | | |
| Oman | Visa required | | |
| Pakistan | eVisa | 90 days | free of charge |
| Palau | Free visa on arrival | 30 days | Can be extended by twice only with a fee |
| Panama | Visa required | | 30 days visa free if hold a valid visitor (used at least once for entry) or resident visa for any of the following nations: UK, USA, Canada, the European Union member state, Australia, Japan, Singapore, South Korea |
| Papua New Guinea | Easy Visitor Permit | 30 days | |
| Paraguay | Visa required | | |
| Peru | Visa required | | |
| Philippines | Visa not required | 30 days | |
| Poland | Visa required | | |
| Portugal | Visa required | | |
| Qatar | eVisa | | |
| Romania | Visa required | | |
| Russia | Visa required | | |
| Rwanda | Visa not required | 30 days | |
| Saint Kitts and Nevis | Electronic Travel Authorisation | 3 months | |
| Saint Lucia | Visa not required | 6 weeks | |
| Saint Vincent and the Grenadines | Visa not required | 3 months | |
| Samoa | Visa not required | 60 days | |
| San Marino | Visa required | | San Marino has not impose visa requirement, however visitors can only access San Marino via Italy, thus multiple entries Schengen visa is required |
| São Tomé and Príncipe | eVisa | 7 days | |
| Saudi Arabia | Visa required | | |
| Senegal | Visa on arrival | 90 days | |
| Serbia | Visa required | | visa free if hold a valid visa or residents of the Cyprus, Ireland, Schengen Area member states, United Kingdom or the United States |
| Seychelles | Free Visitor's Permit on arrival | 3 months | Can be extended up to a year with a fee. |
| Sierra Leone | Visa on arrival / eVisa | 1 month | |
| Singapore | Visa not required | 30 days | |
| Slovakia | Visa required | | |
| Slovenia | Visa required | | |
| Solomon Islands | Visa required | | |
| Somalia | eVisa | 30 days | |
| South Africa | Visa not required | 90 days | |
| South Sudan | eVisa | | Obtainable online; Printed visa authorization must be presented at the time of travel |
| Spain | Visa required | | |
| Sri Lanka | ETA /Visa on arrival | 30 days | Electronic Travel Authorization can also be obtained on arrival.; 30 days extendable to 6 months.; The standard visitor visa allows a stay of 60 days within any 6-month period.; Visa fees (for Standard visitor visa): SAARC - USD 35; Non SAARC - USD 75; e-Visa categories will be charged an additional USD 18.50 service fee.; If transiting from any of the Sri Lankan airports, An e-Visa is exempted (2 day transit period). |
| Sudan | Visa required | | |
| Suriname | Visa not required | 90 days | |
| Sweden | Visa required | | |
| Switzerland | Visa required | | |
| Syria | eVisa | | |
| Tajikistan | Visa required | | |
| Tanzania | Visa not required | 3 months | |
| Thailand | eVisa | | |
| Timor-Leste | Visa on arrival | 30 days | At Presidente Nicolau Lobato International Airport or the Dili Sea Port only. |
| Togo | eVisa | 15 days | |
| Tonga | Visa required | | |
| Trinidad and Tobago | Visa not required | | |
| Tunisia | Visa required | | |
| Turkey | Visa required | | |
| Turkmenistan | Visa required | | |
| Tuvalu | Visa on arrival | 1 month | |
| Uganda | Visa not required | 3 months | |
| Ukraine | Visa required | | |
| United Arab Emirates | Visa required | | |
| United Kingdom and Crown dependencies | Visa required | | |
| United States | Visa required | | |
| Uruguay | Visa required | | |
| Uzbekistan | Visa required | | |
| Vanuatu | Visa not required | 120 days | |
| Vatican City | Visa required | | Vatican City has not imposed a visa requirement, however visitors can only access The Vatican City via Italy, thus a multiple entry Schengen visa is required |
| Venezuela | eVisa | | Introduction of Electronic Visa System for Tourist and Business Travelers. |
| Vietnam | eVisa | 90 days | 30 days visa free when visit Phu Quoc Island |
| Yemen | Visa required | | |
| Zimbabwe | Visa not required | 3 months | |

== Dependent, disputed or restricted territories ==
Unrecognized or partially recognized countries

| Territory | Conditions of access | Notes |
|---|---|---|
| Abkhazia | Visa required | |
| Kosovo | Visa required | Not required if holding multiple entry C type Schengen visa: Do not need a visa a holder of a valid biometric residence permit issued by one of the Schengen member states or a valid multi-entry Schengen Visa, a holder of a valid Laissez-Passer issued by United Nations Organizations, NATO, OSCE, Council of Europe or European Union a holder of a valid travel documents issued by EU Member and Schengen States, United States of America, Canada, Australia and Japan based on the 1951 Convention on Refugee Status or the 1954 Convention on the Status of Stateless Persons, as well as holders of valid travel documents for foreigners (maximum 15-day stay) |
| Northern Cyprus | Visa not required | |
| Palestine | Visa not required | Arrival by sea to the Gaza Strip not allowed. |
| Sahrawi Arab Democratic Republic | | Undefined visa regime in the Western Sahara controlled territory. |
| Somaliland | Visa on arrival | 30 days for 30 US dollars, payable on arrival. |
| South Ossetia | Visa not required | Multiple entry visa to Russia and three-day prior notification are required to enter South Ossetia. |
| Taiwan | Visa required | |
| Transnistria | Visa not required | Registration required after 24h. |

Dependent and autonomous territories

| Territory | Conditions of access | Notes |
China
| Hong Kong | Visa not required | 90 days |
| Macau | Visa on arrival | 30 days |
Denmark
| Faroe Islands | Visa required | |
| Greenland | Visa required | |
France
| French Guiana | Visa required | |
| French Polynesia | Visa required | |
| (France) French West Indies | Visa required | Includes overseas departments of Guadeloupe and Martinique and overseas collectivities of Saint Barthélemy and Saint Martin. |
| Mayotte | Visa required | |
| New Caledonia | Visa required | |
| Réunion | Visa required | |
| Saint Pierre and Miquelon | Visa required | |
| Wallis and Futuna | Visa required | |
Netherlands
| Aruba | Visa required | |
| Caribbean Netherlands | Visa required | Includes Bonaire, Sint Eustatius and Saba. |
| Curaçao | Visa required | |
| Sint Maarten | Visa required | |
New Zealand
| Cook Islands | Visa not required | 31 days |
| Niue | Visa not required | 30 days |
| Tokelau | Visa required | |
United Kingdom
| Akrotiri and Dhekelia | Visa required | |
| Anguilla | Visa required | Holders of a valid visa issued by the United Kingdom do not require a visa. |
| Bermuda | Visa not required | |
| British Indian Ocean Territory | Special permit required | Special permit required. |
| British Virgin Islands | Visa not required | |
| Cayman Islands | Visa not required | |
| Falkland Islands | Visa required | |
| Gibraltar | Visa required | |
| Montserrat | Visa not required | |
| Pitcairn Islands | Visa not required | 14 days visa free and landing fee 35 USD or tax of 5 USD if not going ashore. |
| Ascension Island | eVisa | 3 months within any year period |
| Saint Helena | eVisa | |
| Tristan da Cunha | Permission required | Permission to land required for 15/30 pounds sterling (yacht/ship passenger) for Tristan da Cunha Island or 20 pounds sterling for Gough Island, Inaccessible Island or Nightingale Islands. |
| South Georgia and the South Sandwich Islands | Permit required | Pre-arrival permit from the Commissioner required (72 hours/1 month for 110/160 pounds sterling). |
| Turks and Caicos Islands | Visa required | Holders of a valid visa issued by Canada, United Kingdom or the USA do not required a visa for a maximum stay of 90 days. |
United States
| American Samoa | Visa required | |
| Guam | Visa required | |
| Northern Mariana Islands | Visa required | |
| Puerto Rico | Visa required | |
| U.S. Virgin Islands | Visa required | |
Antarctica and adjacent islands
Special permits required for Bouvet Island, British Antarctic Territory, French Southern and Antarctic Lands, Argentine Antarctica, (Australia) Australian Antarctic Territory, (Antártica Chilena Province) Chilean Antarctic Territory, (Australia) Heard Island and McDonald Islands, (Norway) Peter I Island, (Norway) Queen Maud Land, (New Zealand) Ross Dependency.

== See also ==
- Visa policy of Zambia
- List of diplomatic missions in Zambia
