= Zambian passport =

Passport of the Republic of Zambia issued to Zambian citizens

- The front cover of a contemporary Zambian passport.
- Type: Passport
- Issued by: Zambia
- Purpose: Identification
- Eligibility: Zambian citizenship

The Zambian passport is issued to citizens of Zambia for international travel.

As of 1 January 2017, Zambian citizens had visa-free or visa on arrival access to 63 countries and territories, ranking the Zambian passport 73rd in terms of travel freedom (tied with Cape Verdean and Tunisian passports) according to the Henley visa restrictions index.

For children under 16, passport is valid for 5 years. Applicants over 16 years old get the passport for 10 years. Passports are issued in the following formats:

- 32-page ordinary passport
- 48-page national passport
- Diplomatic passport (red cover)

== Appearance ==
The ordinary passport has green cover with hot gold foil stamping of "Republic of ZAMBIA" on top, followed by the coat of arms of Zambia and the word "PASSPORT". The inside of the cover has a hologram saying "ONE ZAMBIA ONE NATION" on it.

Page 1 of the passport contains a message as follows: "The Government of the Republic of Zambia requests all those whom it may concern to allow the bearer to pass freely without let or hindrance and to afford the bearer such assistance and protection as may be necessary".

Page 3 of the passport contains the description of the bearer as follows:

- Occupation
- Height
- Colour of eyes
- Colour of hair

=== Identity page ===
- Passport holder's photo (38mm x 51mm or 51mm x 64mm, submitted 2 photos per application, can be made from a selfie with online tools like Visafoto or 7ID, one of which must be endorsed by a non-family member recommender who has known the applicant for a period of not less than 2 years)
- Type (P)
- Country code (ZMB)
- Passport number (ZN000000)
- Surname
- Given names
- Nationality
- Date of birth
- NRC number (National ID number)
- Sex
- Place of birth
- Date of issue
- Issuing authority
- Date of expiry

== Languages ==
The data page/information page is printed in English and French.

== See also ==
- List of passports
- Visa requirements for Zambian citizens
