= Visa policy of Equatorial Guinea =

Policy on permits required to enter Equatorial Guinea

All visitors to Equatorial Guinea must obtain an e-visa prior to arrival, unless they come from one of the visa exempt countries mentioned below.

== Visa policy map ==
Equatorial Guinea Visa not required and may enter using ID card Visa not required eVisa

== Visa exemption ==
Citizens of the following countries can visit Equatorial Guinea without a visa:

- Barbados
- Tunisia (30 days)
- Turkey (90 days)
- United Arab Emirates (90 days)

CEMAC countries with national identity card or biometric passport:

- Cameroon
- Central African Republic
- Chad
- Republic of the Congo
- Gabon

_{1 – Does not apply to emergency passports.}

Date of visa changes
- 17 October 2017: CEMAC countries – Cameroon, Central African Republic, Chad, Congo, and Gabon

Citizens of other countries require a visa for all purposes including transit.

Also, holders of diplomatic, official or service passports issued to nationals of Brazil, China, Cuba, Morocco, South Korea and United Arab Emirates do not require a visa for Equatorial Guinea for a maximum period of 90 days.

Visa exemption agreement for holders of diplomatic and service passports was signed with Indonesia in August 2019 and it is yet to come into force.

Serbia and Equatorial Guinea signed an agreement of abolishing visas for diplomatic and service passports on 10 February 2022.

== Electronic Visa (e-Visa) ==
Equatorial Guinea introduced the e-Visa system from 1 July 2023.

e-Visa holders must arrive via Malabo International Airport. People of all nationalities can apply, and the processing fee is 75 USD.

Approval is normally received between 24 – 72 hours after the payment is completed.

== See also ==
- Visa requirements for Equatorial Guinean citizens
