= Visa policy of Zambia =

Policy on permits required to enter Zambia

Visitors to Zambia must obtain an e-Visa unless they are citizens from one of the visa-exempt countries or citizens who may obtain a visa on arrival.

All visitors must hold a passport valid for at least 6 months.

As of November 2014, Zambia and Zimbabwe also offer a universal visa.

== Visa policy map ==
Visa policy of Zambia Zambia Visa not required (30 days for business purposes, 90 days for tourist purposes) Visa on arrival / eVisa eVisa

== Visa exemption ==
Citizens of the following countries and territories may enter Zambia without a visa for up to 30 days within a year for business purposes or 90 days within a year for tourist purposes:

- All European Union member states

- Albania
- Andorra
- Angola
- Antigua and Barbuda
- Argentina
- Australia
- Bahamas
- Bahrain
- Barbados
- Belize
- Bhutan
- Bosnia and Herzegovina
- Botswana
- Brunei
- Canada
- Cape Verde
- China
- Comoros
- Costa Rica
- Dominica
- Dominican Republic
- Eswatini
- Fiji
- Ghana
- Grenada
- Guatemala
- Guyana
- Honduras
- Hong Kong
- Iceland
- Iraq
- Israel
- Jamaica
- Japan
- Kenya
- Kiribati
- Kuwait
- Laos
- Lesotho
- Liberia
- Liechtenstein
- Madagascar
- Malawi
- Malaysia
- Maldives
- Marshall Islands
- Mauritius
- Micronesia
- Moldova
- Monaco
- Montenegro
- Morocco
- Mozambique
- Namibia
- Nauru
- New Zealand
- North Macedonia
- Norway
- Oman
- Palau
- Papua New Guinea
- Qatar
- Saint Kitts and Nevis
- Saint Lucia
- Saint Vincent and the Grenadines
- Samoa
- San Marino
- Sao Tome and Principe
- Saudi Arabia
- Serbia
- Seychelles
- Singapore
- Solomon Islands
- South Africa
- South Korea
- Suriname
- Switzerland
- Tanzania
- Tonga
- Trinidad and Tobago
- Turkey
- Tuvalu
- Uganda
- Ukraine
- United Arab Emirates
- United Kingdom
- United States
- Vanuatu
- Vatican City
- Zimbabwe

In addition, visa exemption applies to holders of passports issued to residents of the following territories:

Holders of the following Australian passports:

- Christmas Island residents
- Cocos (Keeling) Islands residents
- Norfolk Island residents

Holders of the following British passports:

British Overseas Territories Citizens:

- Anguilla
- Bermuda
- British Indian Ocean Territory
- British Virgin Islands
- Cayman Islands
- Falkland Islands
- Gibraltar
- Montserrat
- Pitcairn Islands residents
- Saint Helena, Ascension and Tristan da Cunha
- South Georgia and the South Sandwich Islands
- Turks and Caicos Islands

British Citizens:

- Isle of Man
- Guernsey
- Jersey

Holders of the following Danish passports:

- Faroe Islands residents
- Greenland residents

Holders of the following Dutch passports:

- Aruba residents
- Bonaire residents
- Curaçao residents
- Saba residents
- Sint Eustatius residents
- Sint Maarten residents

Holders of the following Finnish passports:

- Åland residents

Holders of the following French passports:

- Clipperton Island residents
- French Guiana residents
- French Polynesia residents
- French Southern and Antarctic Lands residents
- Guadeloupe residents
- Martinique residents
- Mayotte residents
- New Caledonia residents
- Réunion residents
- Saint Barthélemy residents
- Saint Martin residents
- Wallis and Futuna residents

Holders of the following New Zealand passports:

- Cook Islands residents
- Niue residents
- Tokelau residents

Holders of the following Norwegian passports:

- Bouvet Island residents
- Jan Mayen residents
- Svalbard residents

Holders of the following Portuguese passports:

- Azores residents
- Madeira residents

Holders of the following Spanish passports:

- Canary Islands residents

Holders of the following United States passports:

- American Samoa residents
- Guam residents
- Northern Mariana Islands residents
- United States Virgin Islands residents

Date of visa changes
- 26 March 1972: Romania

== Visa on arrival ==
Citizens of the following countries and territories may obtain a visa for Zambia on arrival for up to 30 days for business purposes or 90 days for tourist purposes:

- Belarus
- Bolivia
- Brazil
- Burundi
- Chile
- Colombia
- Congo
- DR Congo
- Cuba
- Djibouti
- Ecuador
- Eritrea
- El Salvador
- Georgia
- Haiti
- Kazakhstan
- Mexico
- Mongolia
- Myanmar
- Nicaragua
- Panama
- Paraguay
- Peru
- Russia
- Rwanda
- Thailand
- Uruguay
- Western Sahara
- Venezuela
- Vietnam

In addition, visa on arrival applies to holders of passports issued to residents of the following territories:

Holders of the following Australian passports:

- Heard and McDonald Islands residents

Holders of the following French passports:

- Saint Pierre and Miquelon residents

Holders of the following United States passports:

- United States Minor Outlying Islands residents

Holders of diplomatic or official passports of any countries may obtain visa on arrival.

== Electronic visa (e-Visa) ==
Zambia introduced an e-Visa system in late 2014. It is an alternative to visas issued at Zambian missions abroad or on arrival.

Visa holder can stay in Zambia for the period of 90 days during a given calendar year since the date of entry into Zambia. For nationals that may obtain visas at ports of entry, the e-Visa takes 3 working days to process and for nationals that require visas prior to travel to Zambia processing time takes a minimum of 5 working days.

== Universal visa ==
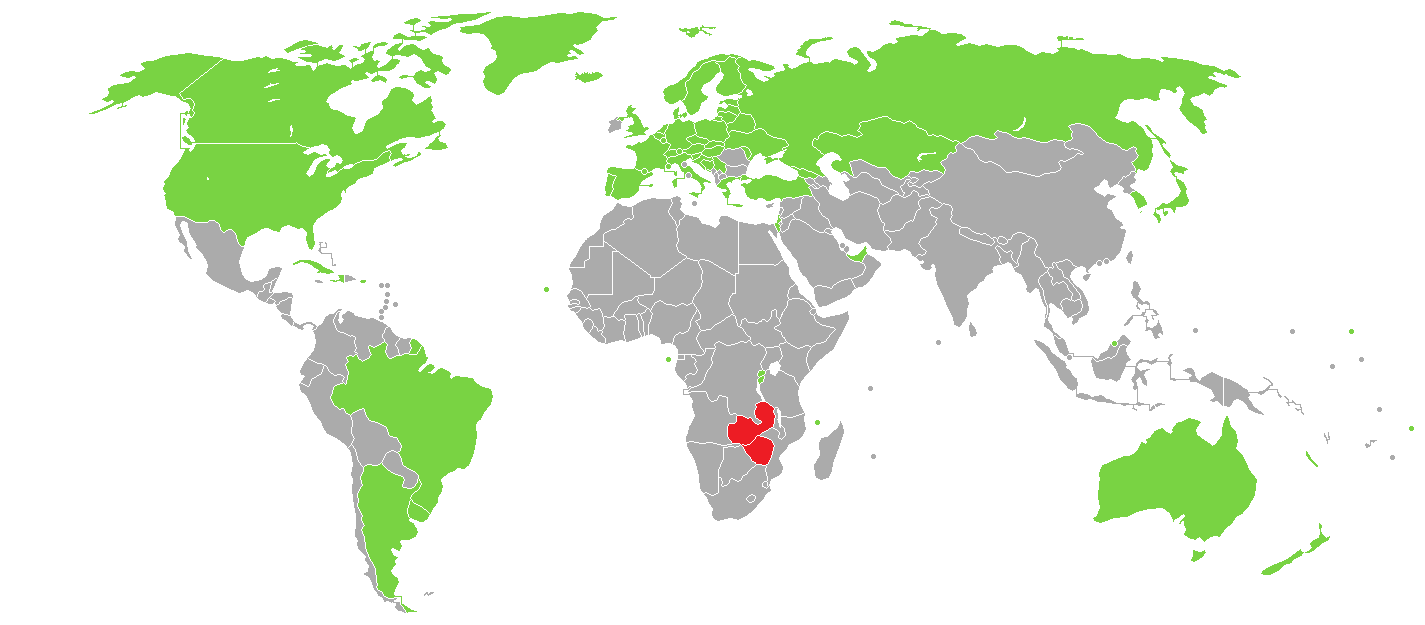
KAZA visa eligible countries

External image
- Map of entry points where universal KAZA visa can be obtained

Zambia and Zimbabwe introduced a universal visa on 28 November 2014 called KAZA Visa. This visa can be obtained on arrival and is valid for both countries for visits up to 30 days while remaining within Zambia and Zimbabwe (including day trips to Chobe National Park in Botswana at Kazungula). In second phase Namibia, Angola and Botswana are expected to join the project. In third stage three SADC pilot countries are expected to join and in fourth stage all SADC countries are expected to become part of the universal visa project.

The universal visa project was suspended in 2015 due to running out of visa stickers and the expiry of the Memorandum of Understanding between the two countries. The new Memorandum was signed in December 2016, extending the list of eligible countries (including territories) from 40 to 65. In Zambia it is issued at Livingstone Airport, Victoria Falls, Kazungula and Lusaka Airport border crossings.

Eligible countries are:

- Andorra
- Argentina
- Australia
- Austria
- Belarus
- Belgium
- Bosnia and Herzegovina
- Brazil
- Brunei
- Burundi
- Canada
- Cape Verde
- Comoros
- Croatia
- Cuba
- Czech Republic
- Denmark
- Estonia
- Finland
- France
- Georgia
- Germany
- Greece
- Haiti
- Hungary
- Iceland
- Israel
- Italy
- Japan
- Kazakhstan
- Latvia
- Liechtenstein
- Lithuania
- Luxembourg
- Marshall Islands
- Moldova
- Monaco
- Netherlands
- New Zealand
- Norway
- Poland
- Portugal
- Russia
- Rwanda
- Samoa
- Sao Tome and Principe
- Serbia
- Slovakia
- Slovenia
- South Korea
- Spain
- Sweden
- Switzerland
- Turkey
- Ukraine
- United Arab Emirates
- United Kingdom
- United States
- Uruguay

== Visitor statistics ==
Most visitors arriving in Zambia were from the following countries of nationality:

Country	2021	2020	2019	2018	2017	2015	2014	2013
Tanzania	169,798	118,708	206,771	161,990	222,095	166,833	219,215	184,187
Zimbabwe	139,881	185,154	424,921	340,263	242,848	225,527	208,962	191,048
Democratic Republic of Congo	75,466	48,311	108,421	82,578	96,480	96,201	89,796	—N/a
South Africa	36,018	28,437	92,033	94,170	92,486	94,030	98,216	87,048
India	14,944	10,960	30,789	25,505	22,337	25,517	21,117	17,136
Mozambique	14,765	12,955	23,671	19,899	19,833			
Malawi	12,683	13,603	26,208	32,667	28,783	31,539	29,579	—N/a
United States	12,256	6,120	39,930	41,390	39,121	38,496	32,625	31,826
Kenya	7,848	5,530	13,924	11,754	10,626			
Botswana	7,315	8,991						
United Kingdom	7,226	8,510	27,019	34,789	43,487	36,997	31,280	32,309
China	6,918	7,696	34,400	27,796	26,562	20,648	30,831	27,603
Namibia	6,148	7,537				22,311	16,742	—N/a
Uganda	4,175							
Germany	2,271	1,502	7,856	9,565	7,952			
France	1,956	1,623	6,142	6,460	5,092			
Netherlands	1,434	1,174						
Canada	1,244	1,406	6,786	6,911	5,311			
Italy	933	851	4,232	5,733	3,138			
Australia	677	1,644	10,614	11,059	8,547			
Denmark	424	379	1,670	1,764	2,225			
Total	554,290	501,606	1,266,427	1,072,012	1,009,173	931,782	946,969	914,576

== See also ==
- Visa requirements for Zambian citizens
- List of diplomatic missions of Zambia

== Sources ==
- Nationals who do not require a visa, Department of Immigration
- Nationals requiring visas on arrival or at missions abroad, Department of Immigration
- Nationals requiring visas prior to travel, Department of Immigration
- e-Visa
