= Visa requirements for Nicaraguan citizens =

Administrative entry restrictions

Visa requirements for Nicaraguan citizens are administrative entry restrictions by the authorities of other states placed on citizens of Nicaragua. As of 2026, Nicaraguan citizens had visa-free or visa on arrival access to 125 countries and territories, ranking the Nicaraguan passport 38th in terms of travel freedom according to the Henley Passport Index.

== Visa requirements map ==
Visa requirements for Nicaraguan citizens Nicaragua Visa not required or Electronic Travel Authorisation Visa available both on arrival or online Visa on arrival eVisa Visa required

== Visa requirements ==
Visa requirements for holders of normal passports traveling for tourist purposes:

| Country | Visa requirement | Allowed stay | Notes (excluding departure fees) |
|---|---|---|---|
| Afghanistan | eVisa | 30 days | Visa is not required in case born in Afghanistan or can proof that one of their parents is a national of Afghanistan or born in Afghanistan.; e-Visa : Visitors must arrive at Kabul International (KBL). |
| Albania | Visa not required | 90 days | |
| Algeria | Visa required | | Visa Issuance for passengers with a boarding authorization traveling as tourists to cities in the south of Algeria (Timimoun, Ghardaia, Ilizi, Djanet or Tamanraset) can obtain a visa on arrival for a maximum of 30 days. They must have: a return/onward ticket, a hotel reservation confirmation. |
| Andorra | Visa not required | | |
| Angola | eVisa | | |
| Antigua and Barbuda | eVisa | | |
| Argentina | Visa not required | 3 months | |
| Armenia | eVisa / Visa on arrival | 120 days | |
| Australia | Visa required | | May apply online (Online Visitor e600 visa). |
| Austria | Visa not required | 90 days | 90 days within any 180 day period in the Schengen Area |
| Azerbaijan | Visa required | | |
| Bahamas | Visa not required | 3 months | |
| Bahrain | eVisa | | |
| Bangladesh | Visa on arrival | | |
| Barbados | Visa not required | 90 days | |
| Belarus | Visa not required | 30 days | Must arrive and depart via Minsk International Airport. |
| Belgium | Visa not required | 90 days | 90 days within any 180 day period in the Schengen Area |
| Belize | Visa not required | 90 days | |
| Benin | eVisa | 30 days | Must have an international vaccination certificate. |
| Bhutan | eVisa | | Visa fee is 40 USD per person and visa application may be processed within 5 business days with duration of stay of 90 days.; e-Visa applicant is also subject to pay Sustainable Development Fee |
| Bolivia | Visa on arrival | | |
| Bosnia and Herzegovina | Visa not required | 90 days | 90 days within any 6-month period |
| Botswana | eVisa | | |
| Brazil | Visa not required | 90 days | |
| Brunei | Visa required | | |
| Bulgaria | Visa not required | 90 days | 90 days within any 180 day period |
| Burkina Faso | eVisa | | |
| Burundi | Visa on arrival | 30 days | |
| Cambodia | eVisa / Visa on arrival | 30 days | Visa is also obtainable online. |
| Cameroon | eVisa | | |
| Canada | Visa required | | US permanent residents (Green card) holders can enter visa free |
| Cape Verde | Visa on arrival | 45 days | Not available at all entry points.; Requirement to register online 5 days before arrival. |
| Central African Republic | Visa required | | |
| Chad | eVisa | | |
| Chile | Visa not required | 90 days | |
| China | Visa required | | Visa on arrival for Macao.; May get a visa on arrival for 5 days at Shenzhen(SZX) airport. |
| Colombia | eVisa | | Residents of North Caribbean Coast Autonomous Region and South Caribbean Coast Autonomous Region do not require a visa. |
| Comoros | Visa on arrival | 45 days | |
| Republic of the Congo | Visa required | | |
| Democratic Republic of the Congo | eVisa | 90 days | |
| Costa Rica | Visa required | | |
| Côte d'Ivoire | eVisa | | e-Visa holders must arrive via Port Bouet Airport. |
| Croatia | Visa not required | 90 days | 90 days within any 180 day period in the Schengen Area |
| Cuba | eVisa | 90 days | |
| Cyprus | Visa not required | 90 days | 90 days within any 180 day period |
| Czech Republic | Visa not required | 90 days | 90 days within any 180 day period in the Schengen Area |
| Denmark | Visa not required | 90 days | 90 days within any 180 day period in the Schengen Area |
| Djibouti | eVisa | 31 days | |
| Dominica | Visa not required | 6 months | |
| Dominican Republic | Visa not required | 90 days | |
| Ecuador | Visa not required | 90 days | |
| Egypt | Visa on Arrival | 30 days | |
| El Salvador | Visa not required | 3 months | ID Card Valid |
| Equatorial Guinea | eVisa | | |
| Eritrea | Visa required | | |
| Estonia | Visa not required | 90 days | 90 days within any 180 day period in the Schengen Area |
| Eswatini | Visa required | | |
| Ethiopia | eVisa | up to 90 days | eVisa holders must arrive via Addis Ababa Bole International Airport |
| Fiji | Visa required | | |
| Finland | Visa not required | 90 days | 90 days within any 180 day period in the Schengen Area |
| France and territories | Visa not required | 90 days | 90 days within any 180 day period in the Schengen Area |
| Gabon | eVisa | | Electronic visa holders must arrive via Libreville International Airport. |
| Gambia | Visa not required | | An entry clearance must be obtained from the Gambian Immigration prior to travel. |
| Georgia | eVisa | | |
| Germany | Visa not required | 90 days | 90 days within any 180 day period in the Schengen Area |
| Ghana | Visa required | | |
| Greece | Visa not required | 90 days | 90 days within any 180 day period in the Schengen Area |
| Grenada | Visa required | | |
| Guatemala | Visa not required | 90 days | ID Card Valid |
| Guinea | eVisa | | |
| Guinea-Bissau | eVisa / Visa on arrival | 90 days | |
| Guyana | Visa required | | |
| Haiti | Visa not required | 3 months | |
| Honduras | Visa not required | 3 months | ID Card Valid |
| Hungary | Visa not required | 90 days | 90 days within any 180 day period in the Schengen Area |
| Iceland | Visa not required | 90 days | 90 days within any 180 day period in the Schengen Area |
| India | e-Visa | 60 days | e-Visa holders must arrive via 32 designated airports (Note: Ahmedabad; Amritsar; Bagdogra; Bengaluru; Bhubaneswar; Chandigarh; Chennai; Coimbatore; Delhi; Gaya; Goa-Dabolim; Goa-Manohar; Guwahati; Hyderabad; Indore; Jaipur; Kannur; Kochi; Kolkata; Kozhikode; Lucknow; Madurai; Mangaluru; Mumbai; Nagpur; Port Blair; Pune; Surat; Thiruvananthapuram; Tiruchirappalli; Varanasi; Visakhapatnam) or 5 designated seaports. (Note: Chennai; Cochin; Mormugao (Goa); Mumbai; Mangalore); An Indian e-Tourist Visa may only be obtained twice within 1 calendar year.; Foreigners of Pakistani origin or who hold a Pakistani Passport are not eligible for an e-Visa. Foreigners who are not Pakistani nationals, but whose parents or grandparents (either paternal or maternal) were born in, or were permanent residents in Pakistan, are also not eligible for an e-Visa. |
| Indonesia | eVisa | | |
| Iran | eVisa/Visa on arrival | 30 days | |
| Iraq | eVisa | | |
| Ireland | Visa required | | |
| Israel | Visa required | | |
| Italy | Visa not required | 90 days | 90 days within any 180 day period in the Schengen Area |
| Jamaica | Visa required | | |
| Japan | Visa required | | Eligible for an e-Visa if residing in one these countries Australia, Brazil, Cambodia, Canada, India, Saudi Arabia, Singapore, South Africa, Taiwan, United Arab Emirates, United Kingdom, United States.; May apply online |
| Jordan | eVisa/Visa on arrival | | Conditions apply.; Not available at all entry points. |
| Kazakhstan | Visa not required | 30 days | 30 days within any 180-day period |
| Kenya | Electronic Travel Authorisation | 3 months | Electronic Travel Authorisation (eTA); Applications can be submitted up to 90 days prior to travel and must be submitted at least 3 days in advance.; eTA fee is USD 32.50.; eTA is good for single entry, but visitors who leave Kenya to other EAC countries may re-enter provided that their eTA is still valid; Proof of reservation at the hotel where visitors plan to stay is required (if staying with friends, an invitation letter is also acceptable).; Yellow fever vaccination certificate is required if coming from endemic countries.; Can also be entered on an East Africa tourist visa issued by Rwanda or Uganda. |
| Kiribati | Visa required | | |
| North Korea | Visa required | | |
| South Korea | K-ETA | 90 days | |
| Kuwait | Visa required | | e-Visa can be obtained for holders of a Residence Permit issued by a GCC member state under the following conditions: To be 18 years old and over.; The residence permit for a GCC state must be valid for at least another 3 months.; To be accompanied by the sponsor of the residence permit if the sponsor is an individual.; Does not apply to holders of a GCC Student Visa and Non-Skilled Worker Visa |
| Kyrgyzstan | eVisa | | Electronic visa holders must arrive via Manas International Airport or Osh Airport or through land crossings with China (at Irkeshtam and Torugart), Kazakhstan (at Ak-jol, Ak-Tilek, Chaldybar, Chon-Kapka), Tajikistan (at Bor-Dobo, Kulundu, Kyzyl-Bel) and Uzbekistan (at Dostuk). |
| Laos | eVisa / Visa on arrival | 30 days | 18 (Note: Savannakhet Airport; Lanetoui - Mengkang (China); Meuangmom - Wan Pong (Myanmar); Banvang - Ban Khok Phai (Thailand); Namngeun - Huay Kon (Thailand); Paksan - Bueng Kan (Thailand); Paktaphan - Pak Saeng (Thailand); Pangmon - Ban Huak (Thailand); Phoudou (Thailand); Dak ta ock - Nam Giang (Vietnam); La Lai (Vietnam); Namkan (Vietnam); Namphao - Cau Treo (Vietnam); Namsoy - Na Meo (Vietnam); Naphao - Cha Lo (Vietnam); Pahang - Long Sap (Vietnam); Panghok - Tây Trang (Vietnam); Phoukeua - Bo Y (Vietnam)) of the 33 border crossings are only open to regular visa holders.; e-Visa may be used to enter Laos through the Luang Prabang, Pakse and Vientiane international airports, 3 Thai-Lao Friendship Bridges (Note: Vientiane (Friendship Bridge 1); Savannakhet (Friendship Bridge 2); Bokeo (Friendship Bridge 4)), in Boten (road and railroad), and in Vientiane (at Khamsavath railway station).; Visa on arrival is available at the Luang Prabang, Pakse and Vientiane international airports, 4 Thai-Lao Friendship Bridges (Note: Vientiane (Friendship Bridge 1); Savannakhet (Friendship Bridge 2); Khammouane (Friendship Bridge 3); Bokeo (Friendship Bridge 4)) and 7 border crossings. (Note: Nongnokkheane - Trapeang Kriel (Cambodia); Boten - Bo han (China); Golden Triangle/Samliemkham (Thailand); Khamsavath railway station (Thailand); Namheuang - Ban Na Kraseng (Thailand); Vang tao - Chongmek (Thailand); Dansavan - Lao Bảo (Vietnam)) |
| Latvia | Visa not required | 90 days | 90 days within any 180 day period in the Schengen Area |
| Lebanon | Visa required | | In addition to a visa, an approval should be obtained from the Immigration department of the General Directorate of General Security (La Surete Generale). |
| Lesotho | eVisa | | |
| Liberia | eVisa | | |
| Libya | eVisa | | |
| Liechtenstein | Visa not required | 90 days | 90 days within any 180 day period in the Schengen Area |
| Lithuania | Visa not required | 90 days | 90 days within any 180 day period in the Schengen Area |
| Luxembourg | Visa not required | 90 days | 90 days within any 180 day period in the Schengen Area |
| Madagascar | eVisa / Visa on arrival | 90 days | |
| Malawi | eVisa/Visa on Arrival | | |
| Malaysia | Visa not required | 1 month | |
| Maldives | Visa on arrival | 30 days | |
| Mali | Visa required | | |
| Malta | Visa not required | 90 days | 90 days within any 180 day period in the Schengen Area |
| Marshall Islands | Visa required | | |
| Mauritania | eVisa | | |
| Mauritius | Visa not required | 90 days | |
| Mexico | Visa required | | Visa not required for holders of valid visa or permanent residence issued by the U.S., Canada, Japan, United Kingdom, Colombia, Chile, or Schengen area. |
| Micronesia | Visa not required | 30 days | |
| Moldova | Visa not required | 90 days | 90 days within any 180 day period |
| Monaco | Visa not required | | |
| Mongolia | eVisa | | |
| Montenegro | Visa not required | 90 days | |
| Morocco | Visa required | | May apply for an e-Visa if holding a valid visa or a residency document issued by one of the following countries: Schengen Area, Australia, Canada, Ireland, New Zealand, United Kingdom, United States a residency document issued by Cyprus, Japan, United Arab Emirates. |
| Mozambique | eVisa/Visa on arrival | 30 days | Conditions apply |
| Myanmar | Visa required | | |
| Namibia | eVisa/Visa on arrival | 3 months | Available at Hosea Kutako International Airport. |
| Nauru | Visa required | | Visa can be obtained in the Nauruan Press Office at the United Nations. |
| Nepal | eVisa/Visa on arrival | 150 days | |
| Netherlands | Visa not required | 90 days | 90 days within any 180 day period in the Schengen Area |
| New Zealand | Visa required | | Holders of an Australian Permanent Resident Visa or Resident Return Visa may be granted a New Zealand Resident Visa on arrival permitting indefinite stay (pursuant to the Trans-Tasman Travel Arrangement), subject to meeting character requirements and obtaining an Electronic Travel Authority prior to departure. |
| Niger | Visa required | | |
| Nigeria | eVisa | | |
| North Macedonia | Visa not required | 90 days | |
| Norway | Visa not required | 90 days | 90 days within any 180 day period in the Schengen Area |
| Oman | eVisa | | Visa-free access applicable only if Nicaraguans have visa entry to USA, Canada, Japan or Australia |
| Pakistan | eVisa | | |
| Palau | Visa on arrival | 30 days | |
| Panama | Visa not required | 90 days | |
| Papua New Guinea | eVisa | | May apply for an e-visa under the type of "Tourist - Own Itinerary" |
| Paraguay | Visa not required | 90 days | |
| Peru | Visa required | | |
| Philippines | Visa not required | 30 days | |
| Poland | Visa not required | 90 days | 90 days within any 180 day period in the Schengen Area |
| Portugal | Visa not required | 90 days | 90 days within any 180 day period in the Schengen Area |
| Qatar | Visa not required | | |
| Romania | Visa not required | 90 days | 90 days within any 180 day period |
| Russia | Visa not required | 90 days | 90 days within any 180 day period |
| Rwanda | eVisa / Visa on arrival | 30 days | |
| Saint Kitts and Nevis | Visa not required | 3 months | |
| Saint Lucia | Visa on arrival | 6 weeks | |
| Saint Vincent and the Grenadines | Visa not required | 1 month | |
| Samoa | Entry Permit on arrival | 60 days | |
| San Marino | Visa not required | | |
| São Tomé and Príncipe | eVisa | | |
| Saudi Arabia | Visa required | | Residents of GCC countries can apply for Saudi e-Visas online and residents of the United States, United Kingdom and European Union may apply for a visa on arrival |
| Senegal | Visa required | | |
| Serbia | Visa required | | |
| Seychelles | Visitor's Permit on arrival | 3 months | |
| Sierra Leone | eVisa | | |
| Singapore | Visa not required | 30 days | |
| Slovakia | Visa not required | 90 days | 90 days within any 180 day period in the Schengen Area |
| Slovenia | Visa not required | 90 days | 90 days within any 180 day period in the Schengen Area |
| Solomon Islands | Visa required | | |
| Somalia | eVisa | 30 days | All visitors must have an approved Electronic Visa (eTAS) before the start of their journey. |
| South Africa | ETA | | |
| South Sudan | eVisa | | Obtainable online; Printed visa authorization must be presented at the time of travel |
| Spain | Visa not required | 90 days | 90 days within any 180 day period in the Schengen Area |
| Sri Lanka | eVisa / Visa on arrival | 30 days | |
| Sudan | Visa required | | |
| Suriname | E-tourist card | 90 days | Multiple entry eVisa is also available. |
| Sweden | Visa not required | 90 days | 90 days within any 180 day period in the Schengen Area |
| Switzerland | Visa not required | 90 days | 90 days within any 180 day period in the Schengen Area |
| Syria | eVisa | | |
| Tajikistan | eVisa | | |
| Tanzania | eVisa / Visa on arrival | | |
| Thailand | eVisa | | |
| Timor-Leste | Visa on arrival | 30 days | Not available at all entry points. |
| Togo | eVisa | 15 days | |
| Tonga | Visa required | | |
| Trinidad and Tobago | Visa not required | 90 days | |
| Tunisia | Visa required | | |
| Turkey | Visa not required | 3 months | |
| Turkmenistan | eVisa | | |
| Tuvalu | Visa on arrival | 1 month | |
| Uganda | eVisa | | Determined at the port of entry. May apply online. |
| Ukraine | eVisa | | |
| United Arab Emirates | eVisa | | |
| United Kingdom | Visa required | | |
| United States | Visa required | | |
| Uruguay | Visa not required | 90 days | |
| Uzbekistan | Visa not required | 30 days | |
| Vanuatu | Visa required | | |
| Vatican City | Visa not required | | |
| Venezuela | Visa not required | 90 days | |
| Vietnam | eVisa | 90 days | Pre-arranged visa obtained online through travel agencies available at Hanoi, Ho Chi Minh City, Phú Quốc or Da Nang airports.; Phú Quốc without a visa for up to 30 days. |
| Yemen | Visa required | | |
| Zambia | eVisa / Visa on arrival | 90 days | |
| Zimbabwe | eVisa / Visa on arrival | | |

== Territories and disputed areas ==
Visa requirements for Nicaraguan citizens for visits to various territories, disputed areas and restricted zones:

| Visitor to | Visa requirement | Notes (excluding departure fees) |
|---|---|---|
| Abkhazia | Visa not required | 90 days |
| Kosovo | Visa not required | 90 days |
| Taiwan | Visa required | |

== See also ==
- Visa policy of Nicaragua
- Nicaraguan passport
