= Arton Capital =

Financial consultancy firm

- Industry: Consultancy
- Founded: 2006; 20 years ago
- Founder: Armand Arton
- Headquarters: Montreal, Canada
- Area served: Worldwide
- Key people: Armand Arton (President & CEO)
- Website: www.artoncapital.com

Arton Capital is a global citizenship financial advisory services firm based in Montreal, Canada. Founded in 2006 by Armand Arton, the firm provides services for global citizenship, with a particular focus on investor programs.

The firm facilitates residence and citizenship programs.

Arton Capital brokers investment agreements, and runs several assessment tools, including The Passport Index, a real-time ranking of the world’s passports.

== Services ==
=== Government advisory services ===
Arton Capital has worked with governments of several countries.

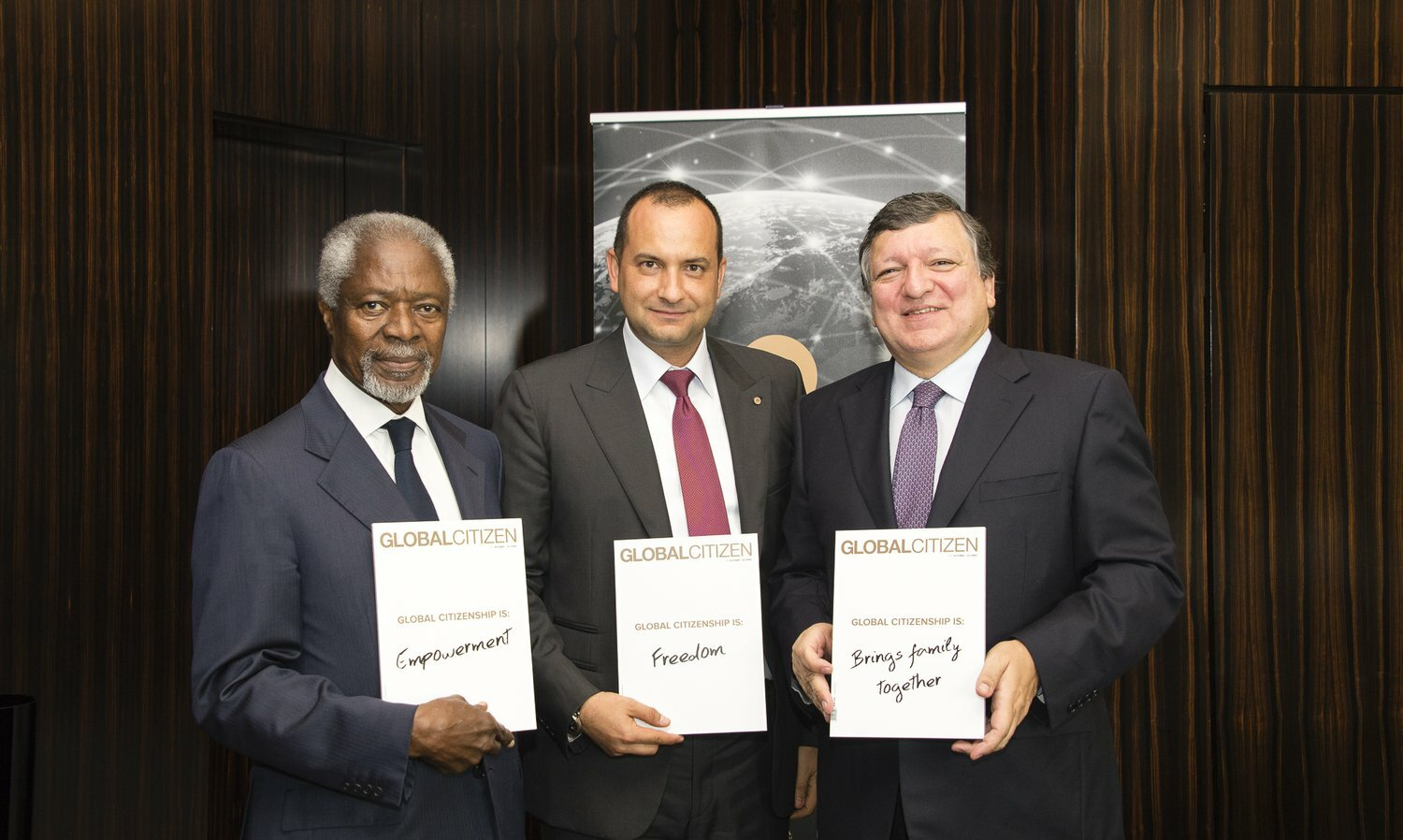
Armand Arton (centre) with Kofi A. Annan, 7th Secretary-general of the United Nations (left) and José Manuel Barroso, former prime minister of Portugal (right) at the 2015 Global Citizen Forum held in Monaco.

It also advises on risk management, including investigative due diligence, awareness of politically exposed persons, anti-money laundering measures, and countering the financing of terrorism.

=== Investor advisory services ===
The online real-time global rankings are based on the freedom of movement and visa-free travel offered by each passport. In addition to advisory services, Arton Capital also commissions research on wealth trends such as the Philanthropy Report.

=== Online tools and services ===
The Arton Index is a list of Global Citizenship Programs, ranked according to five factors, cost, speed, mobility, quality of life, and simplicity, weighting cost most highly and combining for a total score out of 100. The index is revised semi-annually in June and December.
