= Visa policy of Togo =

Policy on permits required to enter Togo

Visitors to Togo must obtain an electronic visa, unless they come from one of the visa-exempt countries. Alternatively, they may obtain a visa from one of the Togolese diplomatic missions.

== Visa policy map ==
Visa policy of Togo Togo Visa-free access (30 days) eVisa

== Visa exemption ==
Citizens of the following countries can visit Togo without a visa, for a stay up to the duration listed below:

30 days

- All African Union member states

Date of visa changes
- 30 April 1980: ECOWAS (Economic Community of West African States): Benin, Burkina Faso, Cape Verde, Gambia, Ghana, Guinea, Guinea-Bissau, Ivory Coast, Liberia, Mali, Niger, Nigeria, Senegal, Sierra Leone
- 21 July 2022: Morocco (bilateral, 90 days)
- 18 May 2026: All other African Union member states (unilateral, 30 days)

Diplomatic and service passports of China (including passports for public affairs) and Russia can visit without a visa.

=== Future changes ===
Togo has signed visa exemption agreements with the following countries, but they have not yet entered into force:

Country	Passports	Agreement signed on
Central African Republic	All	29 July 2018
Saint Kitts and Nevis	All	24 March 2019
Qatar	Diplomatic and service	30 April 2018
Serbia	Diplomatic and service	16 January 2023
São Tomé and Príncipe	All	23 June 2024
India	Diplomatic, service and official	3 July 2024
Rwanda	All	17 January 2026

== Immigration Form ==
All visitors, whether they require a visa or not, must complete an immigration form (no later than 24 hours before arrival).

== eVisa ==
Togo no longer issues visa on arrival and travelers from all countries must apply for eVisa instead.

Applications must be made at least five days before arrival in Togo. According to the eVisa website, processing times takes a maximum of five 5 working days. Visitors should be aware of potential delays.

Duration of stay	Number of entry	Fee
15 days	Single	25,000 CFA franc
15 days	Multiple	35,000 CFA franc
30 days	Multiple	45,000 CFA franc
90 days	Multiple	65,000 CFA franc

== See also ==
- Visa requirements for Togolese citizens
