= Togolese passport =

Passport issued to citizens of Togo

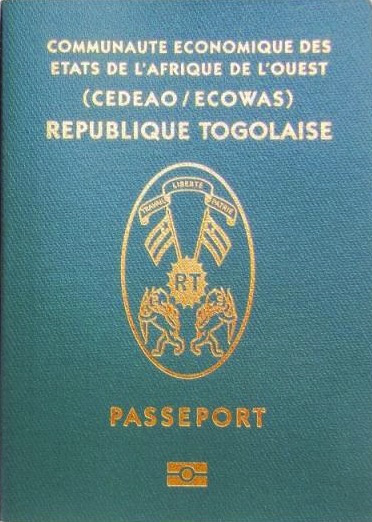
- The front cover of a Togolese passport
- Type: Passport
- Issued by: Togo
- First issued: 2012 (current version)
- Purpose: Identification
- Eligibility: Togolese citizenship
- Expiration: 5 years

Togolese passports are issued to Togolese citizens to travel outside Togo. Togolese citizens can travel to member states of the Economic Community of West African States (ECOWAS) without a passport, national ID cards are sufficient.

== Physical properties ==
- Surname
- Given names
- Nationality Togolese
- Date of birth
- Sex
- Place of birth
- Date of Expiry
- Passport number

== Languages ==
The data page/information page is printed in French and English.

== See also ==
- ECOWAS passports
- List of passports
- Visa requirements for Togolese citizens
