= Equatorial Guinean passport =

Passport issued to citizens of Equatorial Guinea

- Equatorial Guinean biometric passport front cover
- Type: Passport
- Issued by: Equatorial Guinea
- Purpose: Identification
- Eligibility: Equatoguinean citizenship

The Equatorial Guinean passport (Spanish: pasaporte ecuatoguineano) is issued to citizens of the Equatorial Guinea for international travel.

As of 1 January 2017, Equatorial Guinean citizens had visa-free or visa on arrival access to 46 countries and territories, ranking the Equatorial Guinean passport 89th in terms of travel freedom (tied with Central African Republic passport) according to the Henley visa restrictions index.

== Languages ==
The data page/information page is printed in Spanish and French.

== See also ==
- List of passports
- Visa requirements for Equatorial Guinean citizens
