= Nicaraguan passport =

Passport

Nicaraguan passport; Pasaporte nicaragüense
- The front cover of a contemporary Nicaraguan passport.
- Type: Passport
- Issued by: Nicaragua
- Purpose: Identification
- Eligibility: Nicaraguan citizenship

The Nicaraguan passport (Spanish: Pasaporte nicaragüense) is issued to citizens of Nicaragua for international travel. As of April 2025, Nicaraguan citizens had visa-free or visa on arrival access to 127 countries and territories, ranking the Nicaraguan passport 41st in terms of travel freedom according to the Henley Passport Index.

The current Nicaraguan passport has 89 security features, including bidimensional barcodes, holograms, and watermarks, and is reportedly one of the least forgeable documents in the world.

== Appearance ==
Like all Central American passports, the cover is navy blue with gold letters indicating the official name of the country in Spanish; at the top it has the words Centroamérica and in the middle a map of Central America showing the territory of Nicaragua shaded. At the bottom it has a text indicating the type of passport.

The passport consists of 48 pages. It is 124 mm in width and 86 mm in height.

=== Identification page ===
- Photo of the passport holder
- Type ("P" for passport)
- Code of the country
- Passport serial number
- Surname and first name of the passport holder
- Citizenship
- Date of birth (DD. MM. YYYY)
- Gender (M for men or F for women )
- Place of birth
- Date of issue (DD. MM. YYYY)
- Passport holder's signature
- Expiry date (DD. MM. YYYY)
- Issuing authority

== Validity ==
Passports for people over 16 years of age are valid for ten years and for people under 16 years of age for five years.

== See also ==
- Visa requirements for Nicaraguan citizens
- Central America-4 passport
