= Yemeni passport =

Passport of the Republic of Yemen issued to Yemeni citizens

- The front cover of a contemporary Yemeni passport.

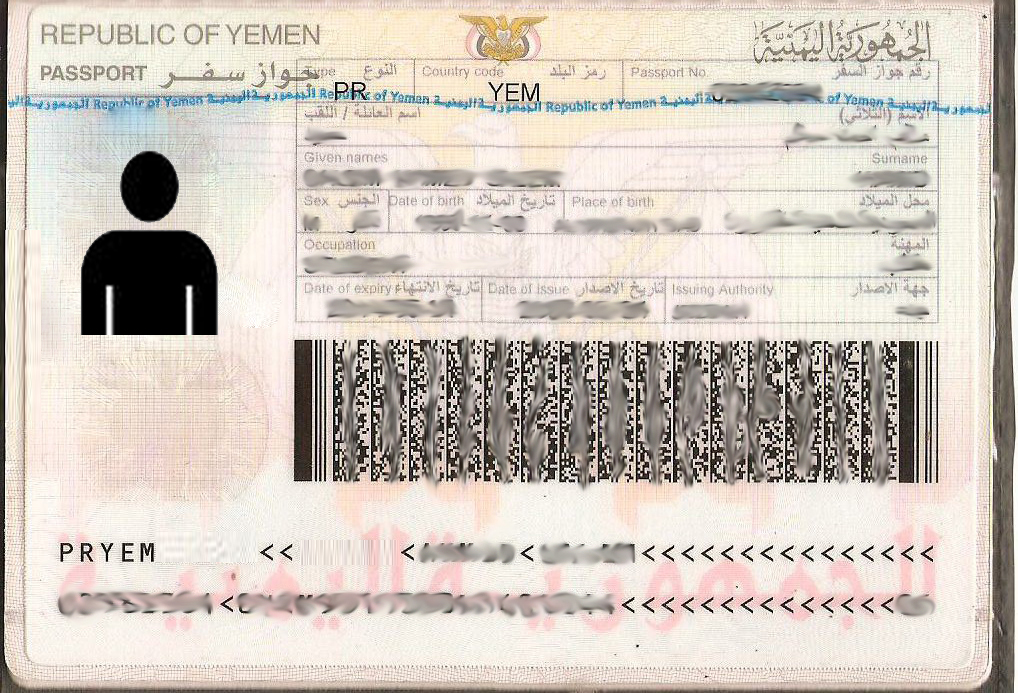
- Details page in Yemeni passport.
- Type: Passport
- Issued by: Yemen
- Purpose: Identification
- Eligibility: Yemeni citizenship
- Expiration: 6 years

A Yemeni passport is a government document used by citizens of Yemen for international travel. Yemeni passports are issued by the Immigration and Naturalization Service of the Ministry of the Interior, and by some Yemeni consulates and embassies around the world. (Note: Embassy of the Republic of Yemen, Canada For example, the Consulate in Ottawa does not issue or renew passports.)

Yemeni passports are typically 48 pages long and have a dark blue cover inscribed with the Emblem of Yemen (and the words "Republic of Yemen" and "Passport" in English and Arabic). As Arabic is a right-to-left script, the passport pages read from right to left. The passport is valid for six years after the date of issue.

Before 1967, when Aden was a British colony (Colony of Aden), British passports were given to travelers from there.

== Security tags ==
Many security tags are found in the Yemeni passport to prevent fraud. Security tags are located on the first page. The barcode and two-dimensional watermark are located in another. When exposed to light, the passport shows a map of Yemen and the country's logo.

When exposed to light, the passport page number, written in Arabic and English, is visible at the top of the sheet on both sides. The edge of the paper contains a silver stripe flag of the nation repeated 10 times and the word 'Yemen' written in Arabic and English. The emblem of the nation is printed three times in the middle.

== Visa requirements ==
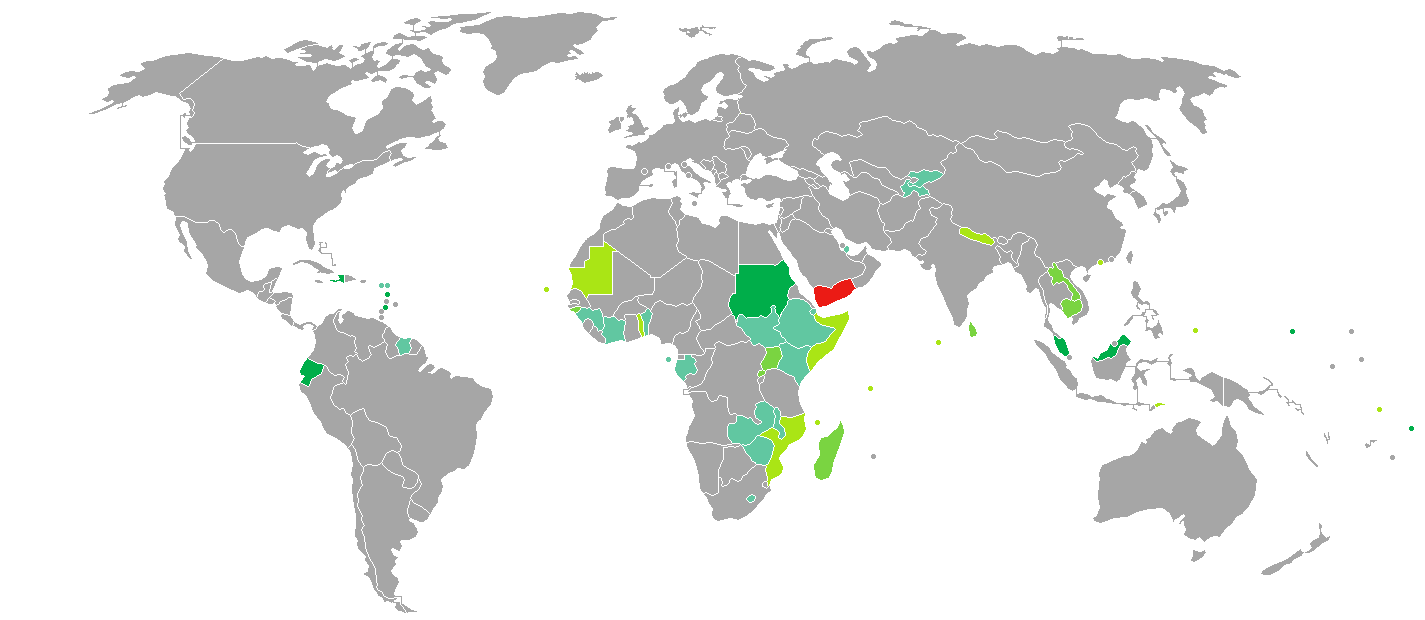
Countries and territories with visa-free or visa on arrival entry for holders of regular Yemeni passports Yemen Visa free access Visa on arrival eVisa Visa available both on arrival or online Visa required

In 2016, Yemeni citizens had visa-free or visa-on-arrival access to 38 countries and territories. This ranked the Yemeni passport 97th worldwide according to the Visa Restrictions Index. However, as of 2019, it has dropped to the 104th spot.

As of 2025, according to Passport Index, Yemeni citizens have visa-free or visa-on arrival access to 41 countries.

== Historical Passports of Yemen ==
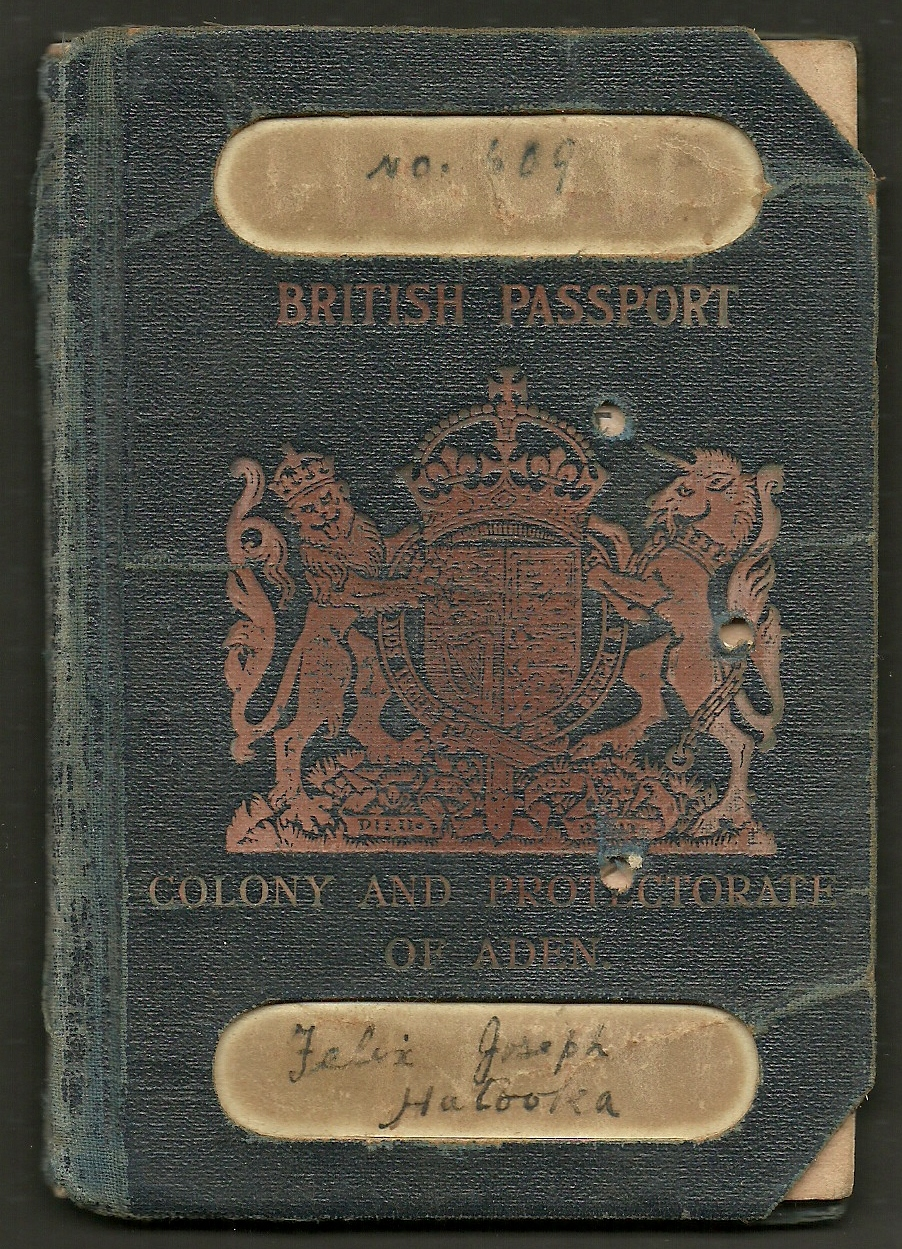
Colony of Aden passport

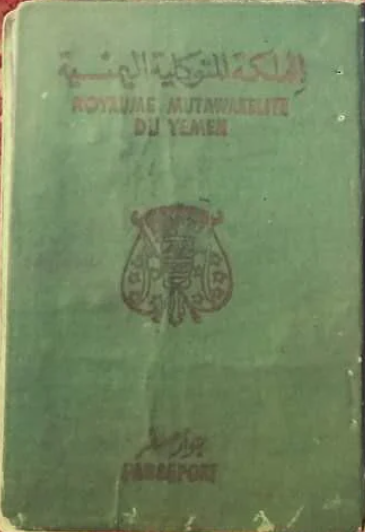
Earliest known variant of a Kingdom of Yemen passport

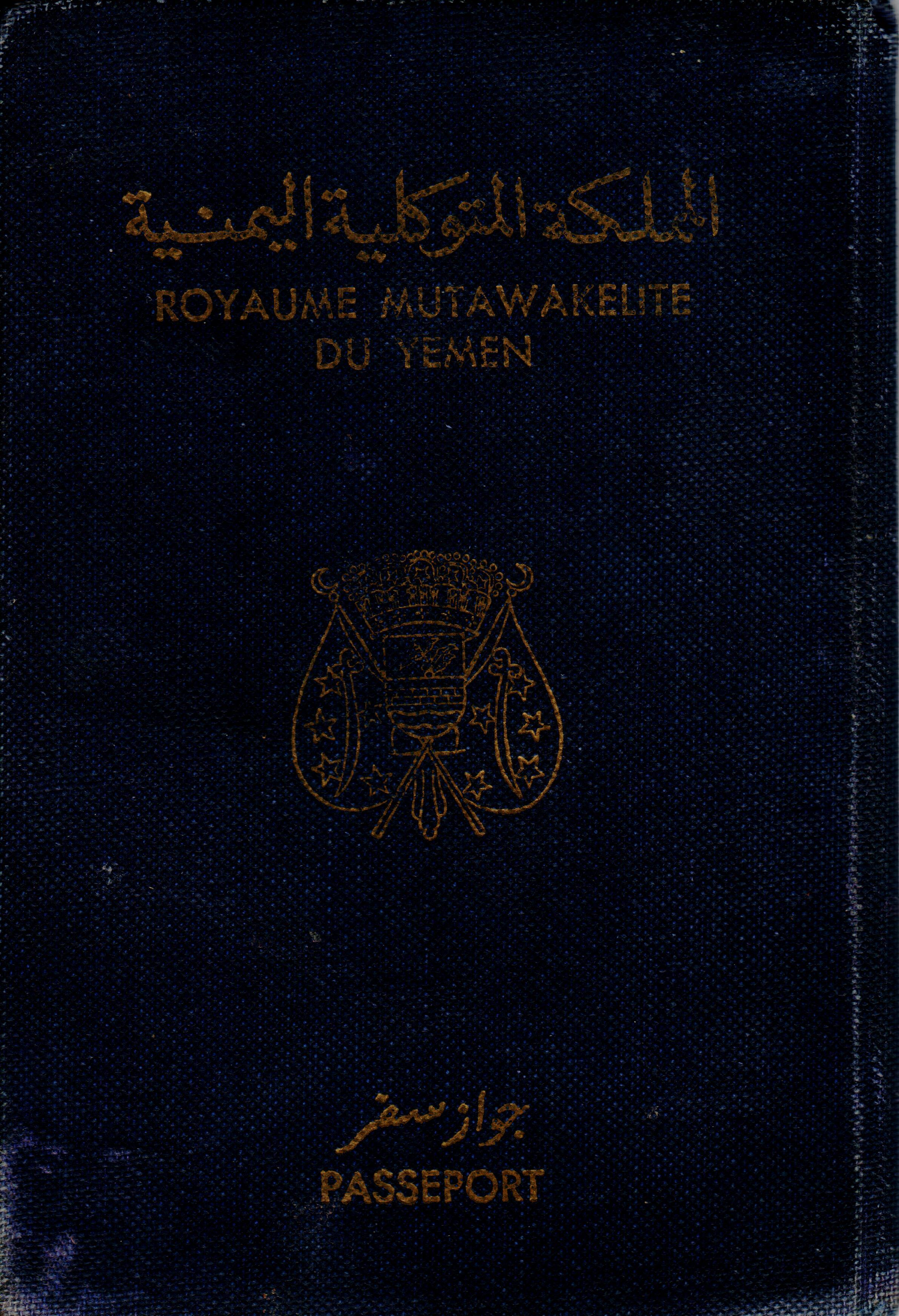
Last variant of a Kingdom of Yemen passport

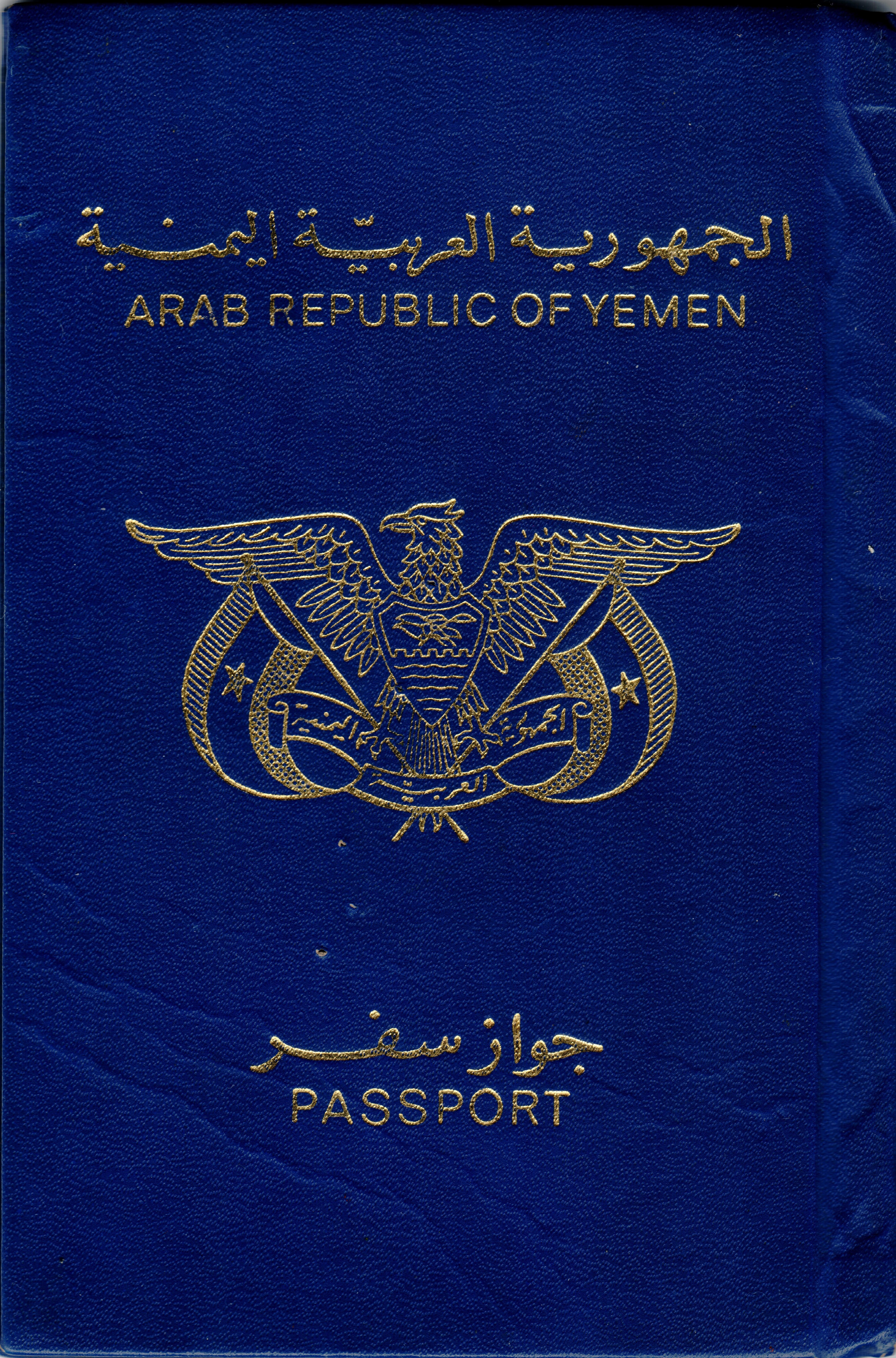
First variant of a Yemen Arab Republic Passport

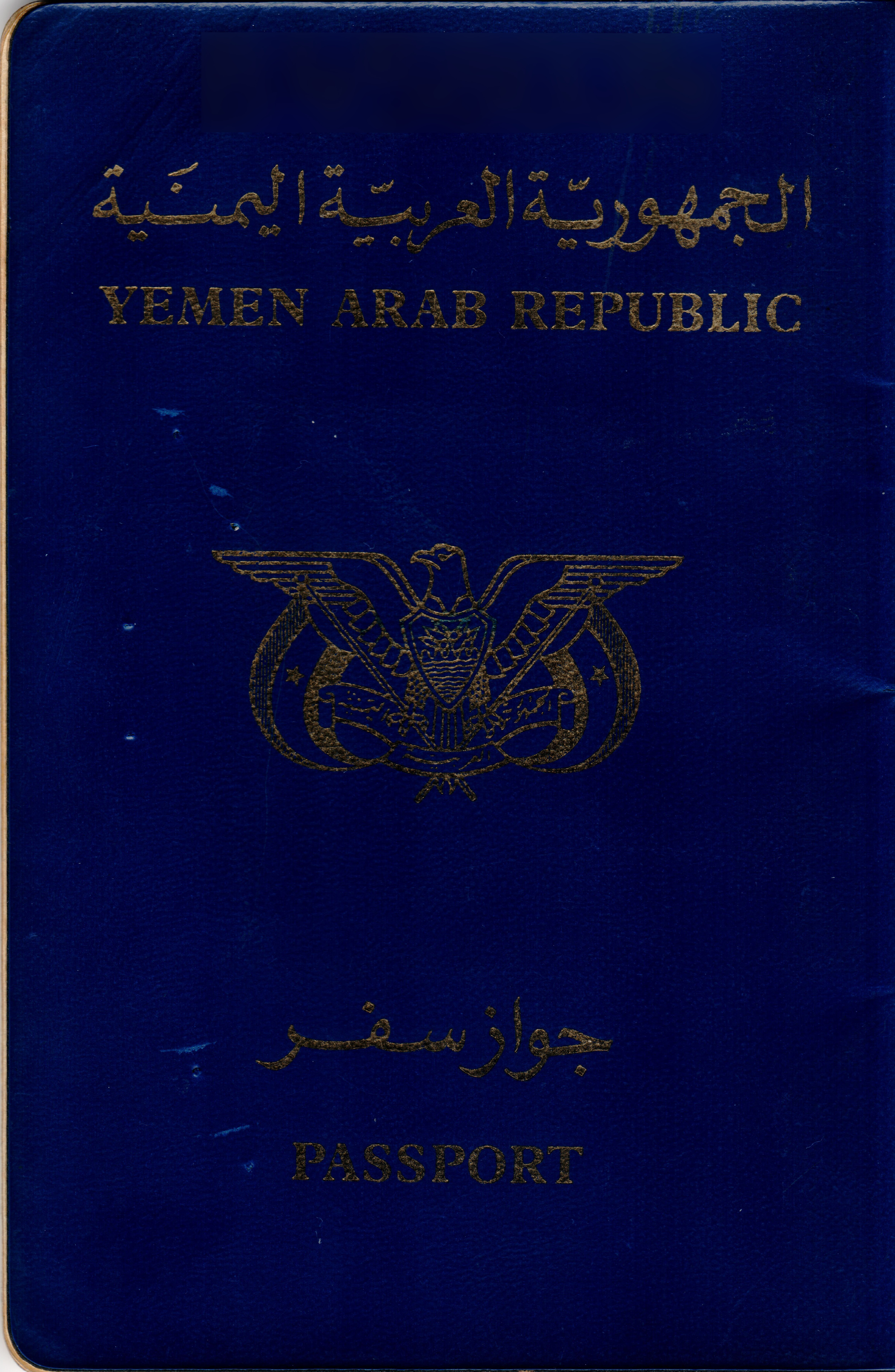
Second variant of a Yemen Arab Republic Passport

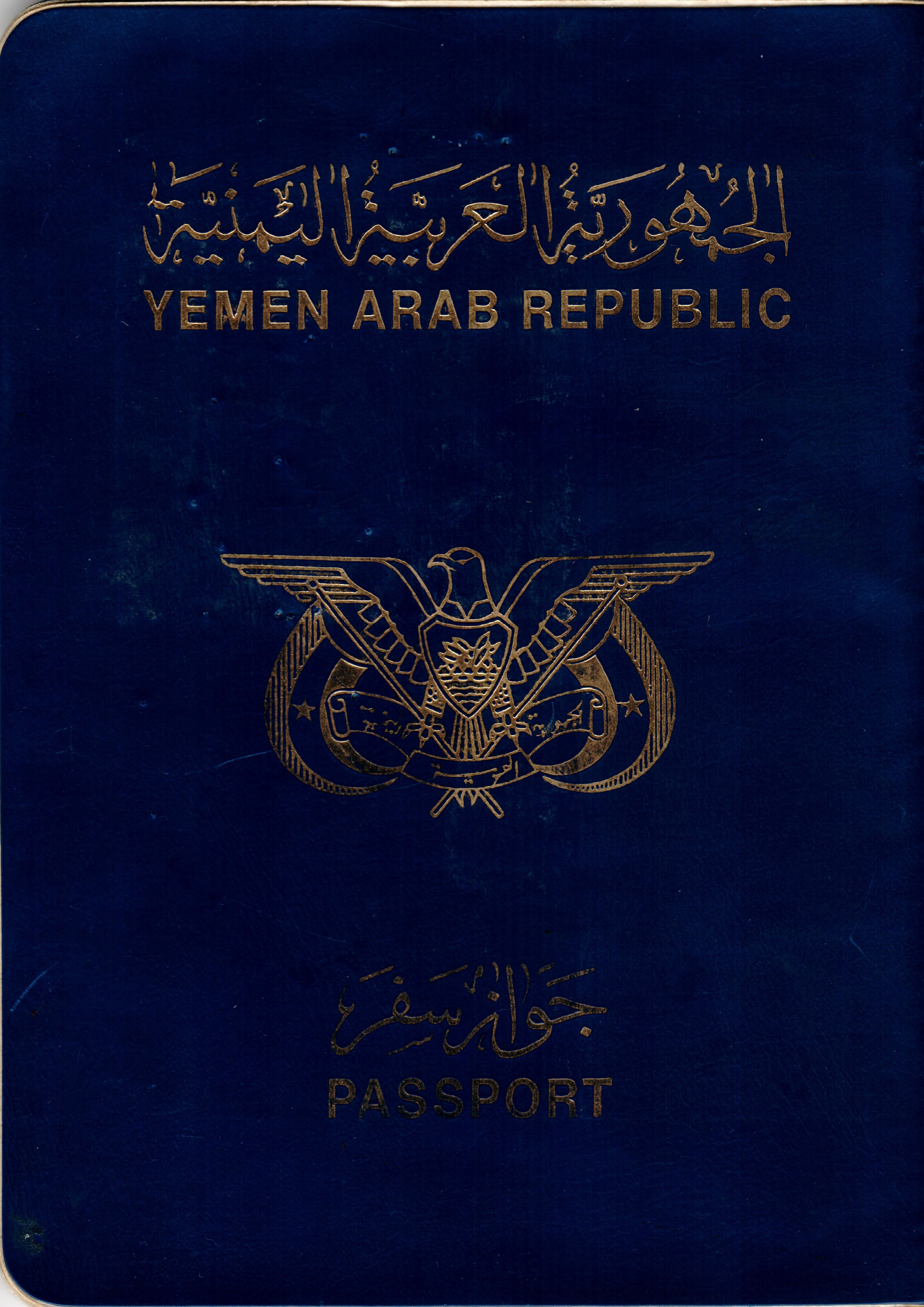
Third and final variant of a Yemen Arab Republic Passport

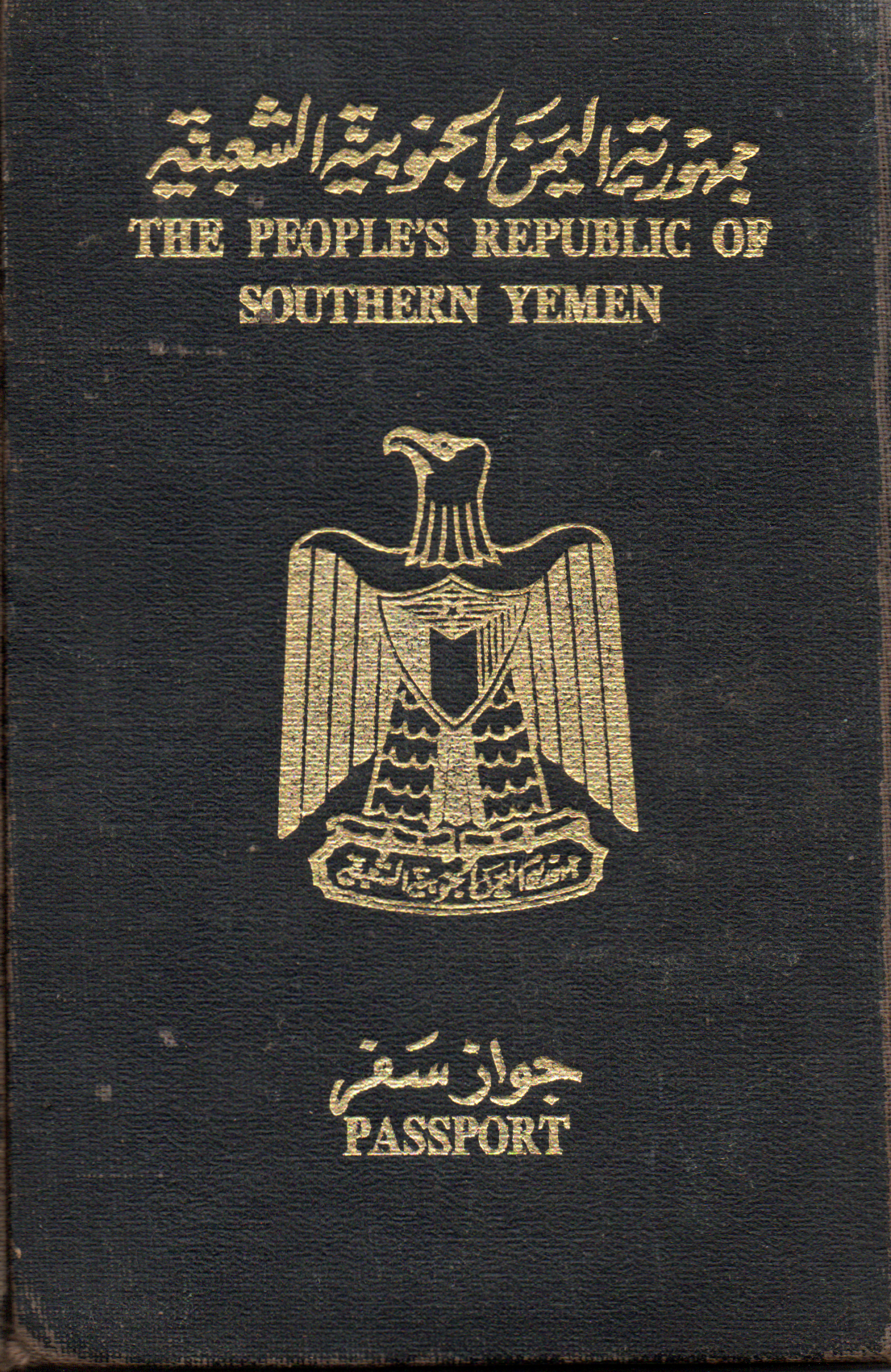
Passport of the People's Republic of Southern Yemen

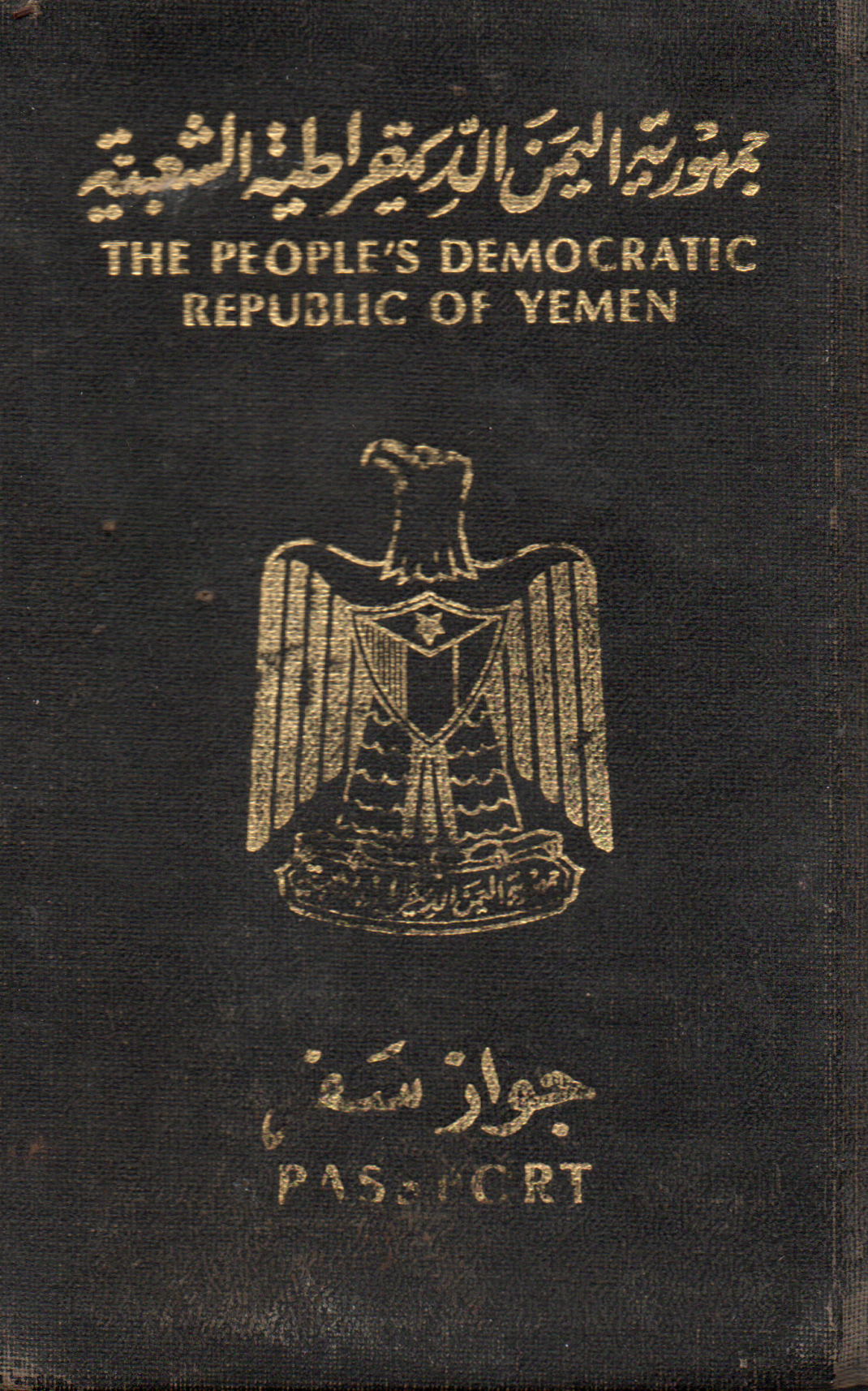
Passport of the People's Democratic Republic of Yemen

== See also ==
- Visa requirements for Yemeni citizens
- Visa policy of Yemen
