= Congolese visa policy =

Congolese visa policy may refer to:

- Visa policy of the Democratic Republic of the Congo
- Visa policy of the Republic of the Congo

== See also ==
- Visa requirements for Democratic Republic of the Congo citizens
- Visa requirements for Republic of the Congo citizens
