= Congo passport =

Congo passport or Congolese passport, may refer to:

- Democratic Republic of the Congo passport for Congo-Kinshasa, the former Zaire, former Belgian colony
- Republic of the Congo passport for Congo-Brazzaville, former French colony
