= Visa policy of Rwanda =

Policy on permits required to enter Rwanda

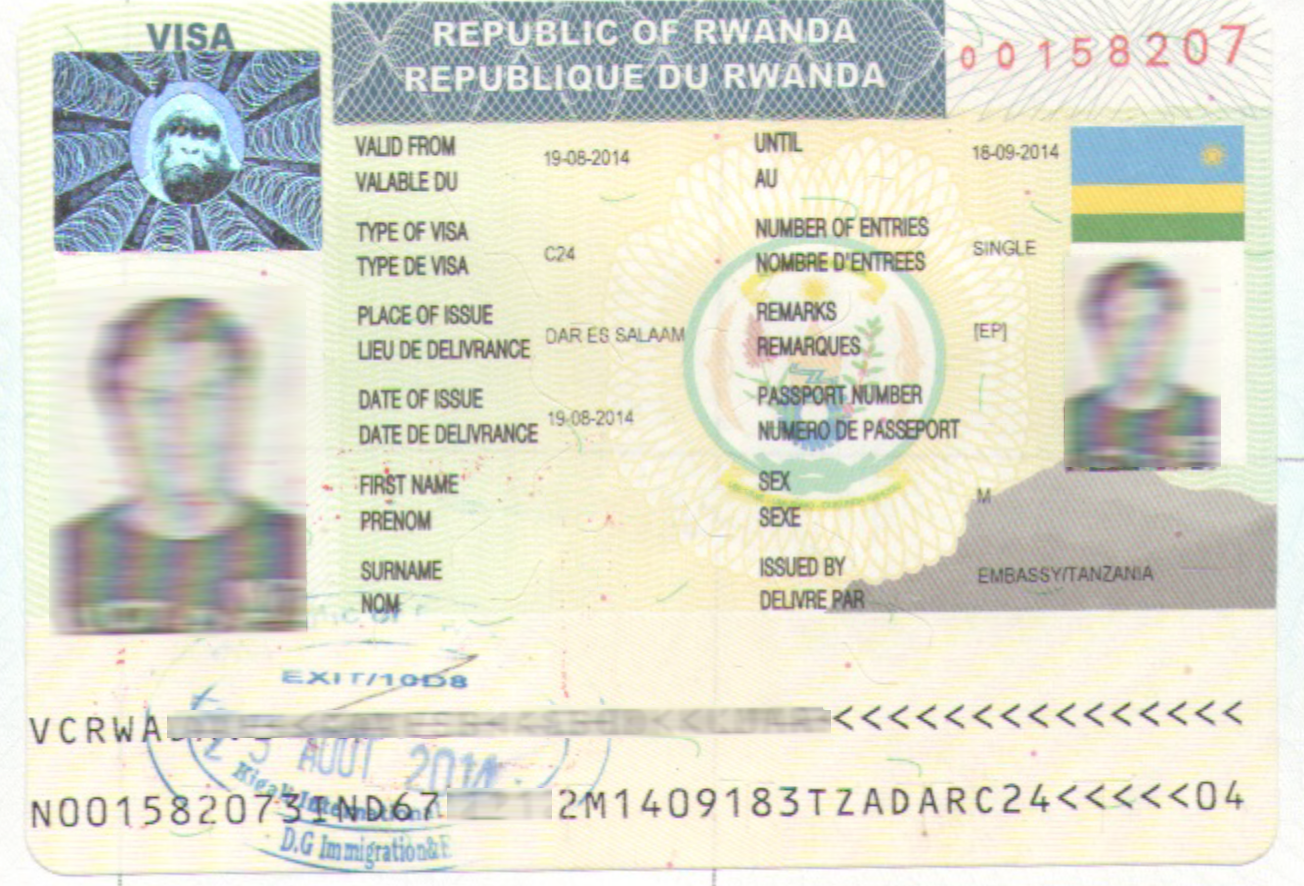
Rwanda tourist visa issued at Rwandan embassy in Tanzania in 2014

The Republic of Rwanda, a member of the East African Community, allows citizens of all countries that are not visa-exempt to obtain a visa on arrival. In addition, they may also obtain an e-Visa online before departure.

All visitors must have a passport valid for at least 6 months with at least one empty page. Kenyans and Ugandans may use an ID card in lieu of a passport to enter Rwanda.

== Visa policy map ==
Rwanda Visa not required (6 months) Visa not required (90 days) Visa not required (30 days) Visa on arrival or eVisa

== Visa exemption ==
Citizens of the following countries are exempt from paying entry fees and may enter Rwanda without a visa for the following period:

6 months

- Burundi
- Kenya
- South Sudan
- Tanzania
- Uganda

90 days

- Angola
- Benin
- Central African Republic
- Chad
- DR Congo
- Côte d'Ivoire
- Ghana
- Guinea
- Haiti
- Indonesia
- Jordan
- Mauritius
- Philippines
- Qatar
- Saint Kitts and Nevis
- São Tomé and Príncipe
- Senegal
- Seychelles
- Sierra Leone
- Singapore

30 days

- Albania
- Algeria
- Andorra
- Antigua and Barbuda
- Armenia
- Australia
- Bahamas
- Bangladesh
- Barbados
- Belgium
- Belize
- Botswana
- Brunei
- Bulgaria
- Burkina Faso
- Cambodia
- Cameroon
- Canada
- Cape Verde
- Comoros
- Congo
- Cyprus
- Djibouti
- Dominica
- Egypt
- Equatorial Guinea
- Eritrea
- Eswatini
- Ethiopia
- Fiji
- France
- Gabon
- Gambia
- Greece
- Grenada
- Guinea-Bissau
- Guyana
- India
- Jamaica
- Kiribati
- Laos
- Lebanon
- Lesotho
- Liberia
- Libya
- Luxembourg
- Madagascar
- Malawi
- Malaysia
- Maldives
- Mali
- Malta
- Mauritania
- Moldova
- Monaco
- Morocco
- Mozambique
- Namibia
- Nauru
- New Zealand
- Niger
- Nigeria
- North Macedonia
- Pakistan
- Papua New Guinea
- Romania
- Sahrawi Republic
- Saint Lucia
- Saint Vincent and the Grenadines
- Samoa
- Solomon Islands
- Somalia
- South Africa
- Sri Lanka
- Sudan
- Switzerland
- Togo
- Tonga
- Trinidad and Tobago
- Tunisia
- Tuvalu
- United Kingdom
- Vanuatu
- Vietnam
- Zambia
- Zimbabwe

Holders of diplomatic and service category passports of China, Djibouti, Ethiopia, Gabon, India, Israel, Morocco, Mozambique, Namibia, Russia, Singapore, Turkey, and United Arab Emirates do not require a visa for up to 90 days (unless otherwise stated).

In addition, citizens of China holding passports endorsed "for public affairs" do not need a visa for a maximum stay of 90 days.

On November 2, 2023, Rwanda President has announced the impending removal of visa fees for all African visitor.

In September 2024, Rwanda signed mutual visa waiver agreements with the Dominican Republic, Dominica and the Bahamas which are yet to be ratified. Rwanda signed visa exemption agreements for holders of diplomatic and service passports with Azerbaijan in September 2023 and with Kazakhstan in September 2024 and they are yet to be ratified.

According to the Hong Kong Immigration Department, citizens of Hong Kong can enter Rwanda without a visa for 1 month.

== Visa on arrival ==
Visitors from all countries have been eligible for visa on arrival since 1 January 2018. Citizens of Common Market for Eastern and Southern Africa countries that are not visa exempt receive visas valid for 90 days, while other visitors are granted visas valid for 30 days.

Since 10 March 2020, nationals of member states of either the African Union, the Commonwealth of Nations or La Francophonie are waived visa fees that are normally payable when obtaining a visa on arrival.

== Electronic Visa (e-Visa) ==
Citizens of countries that are not visa-exempt may also obtain a visa online or at a Rwandan diplomatic mission, if they prefer.

An entry visa is valid for a single entry for a period not exceeding 30 days and is processed within three working days.

== See also ==
- Visa requirements for Rwandan citizens
- Rwandan passport
