= South Sudanese passport =

Passport of the Republic of South Sudan issued to the citizens of South Sudan

- South Sudanese passport front cover
- Type: Passport
- Issued by: South Sudan
- Purpose: Identification
- Eligibility: South Sudanese citizenship

The South Sudanese passport is given to citizens of South Sudan for international travel. The Republic of South Sudan started issuing internationally recognised electronic passports in January 2012. The passports were officially launched by President Salva Kiir on 3 January 2012 at a ceremony in the capital city of Juba. They are valid for five years.

== Visa requirements ==
As of 1 January 2017, South Sudanese citizens had visa-free or visa on arrival access to 37 countries and territories, ranking the South Sudanese passport 96th in terms of travel freedom (tied with Ethiopian and Lebanese passports) according to the Henley visa restrictions index.

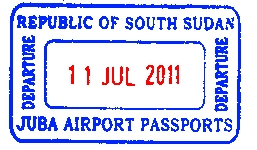

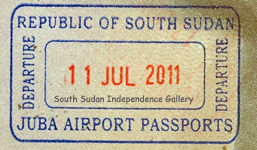

== Complications ==
Following economic crises and hyperinflation, it was reported in November 2017 that the German company contracted to administer the passport programme had suspended operations after failing to receive payment of a $500,000 bill. The Civil Regristry, Nationality, Passport and Immigration (CNPI) began issuing passports again in December 2017.

In August 2024, the CNPI indefinitely suspended South Sudanese passport issuance, citing a system failure caused by the expiration of printing software. The CNPI resumed issuing passports on 19 January 2026.

== See also ==
- Visa requirements for South Sudanese citizens
- South Sudanese nationality law
- List of passports
