= Burundian passport =

Travel document

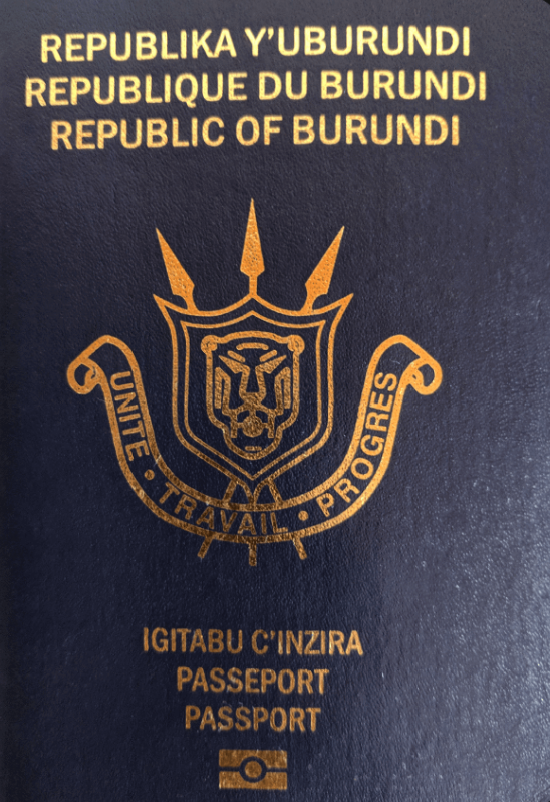
- Front cover of the old version of the Burundian passport before the introduction of the EAC versions
- Type: Passport
- Issued by: Burundi
- Purpose: Identification
- Eligibility: Burundian citizenship
- Expiration: 10 years

The Burundian passport is issued to citizens of Burundi for international travel.

== Physical appearance ==
The biometric passport is a 52-page document with sky blue cover for ordinary passports, light green cover for service passports and blood red cover for diplomatic passports. All East African countries follow the same colour scheme (Red, Green Blue) with only a variation in colour intensity by for each member country.

The cover bears, in capital, the name of the regional bloc and the name of the country ( EAST AFRICAN COMMUNITY; REPUBLIC OF BURUNDI). The inner side of the cover bears the emblem of the East African Community. The first page of the passport (the page after the cover page) bears, in capital letters "East African Community" followed by the name of the country in two languages, Kirundi and English (REPUBLIKA Y'UBURUNDI; REPUBLIC OF BURUNDI). Below that, follows a message by the President of the Republic of Burundi to all immigration authorities written in 4 languages (the 2 official languages of the EAC which are English and Swahili and the 2 official languages of Burundi; French and Kirundi). The messages reads as follows:

"Kwizina rya Nyene Icubahiro Umukuru w'Igihugu c'Uburundi, turabasavye ko uwufise ico gitabu ko yokworoherezwa mu ngendo ziwe, yongere afashwe bikenewe."-Kirundi version

"These are to request and require in the Name of the President of the Republic of Burundi all those whom it may concern to allow the bearer to pass freely without let or hinderance and to afford teh bearer such assistance and protection as may be necessary."- English version 

"Hii ni kuwaomba na kuwasihi, kwa jina la Rais wa jamuhuri ya Burundi, wote wanaohusika, kwa kusudi la kumruhusu mwenye pasipoti hii kupita bila kizuizi ama kipingamizi chochote na vile vile kumpa msaada na ulinzi wowote ambao utakaoonekana kuwa lazima." -Swahili version

"Au Nom de Son Excellence Monsieur le Président de la République du Burundi, nous vous prions de bien vouloir laisser librement circuler le titulaire de ce passeport  et lui prêter main forte et protection en cas de nécessité." French version

The coat of arms of Burundi and the emblem of the East African Community appear on the third page with the emblem of the EAC on top of the page and the coat of arms at the bottom. An outline of the country's geographic shape also appear on the first page and the third page. All other pages contain an outline of the shape of the country's geographic shape with a traditional Burundian drum in the middle of the outline. The drum is coloured with the colors of Burundi's flag. All pages from page 3 to the last page also contain the serial number of the passport perforated at the top of the page and below that the words "VIZA - VISAS".

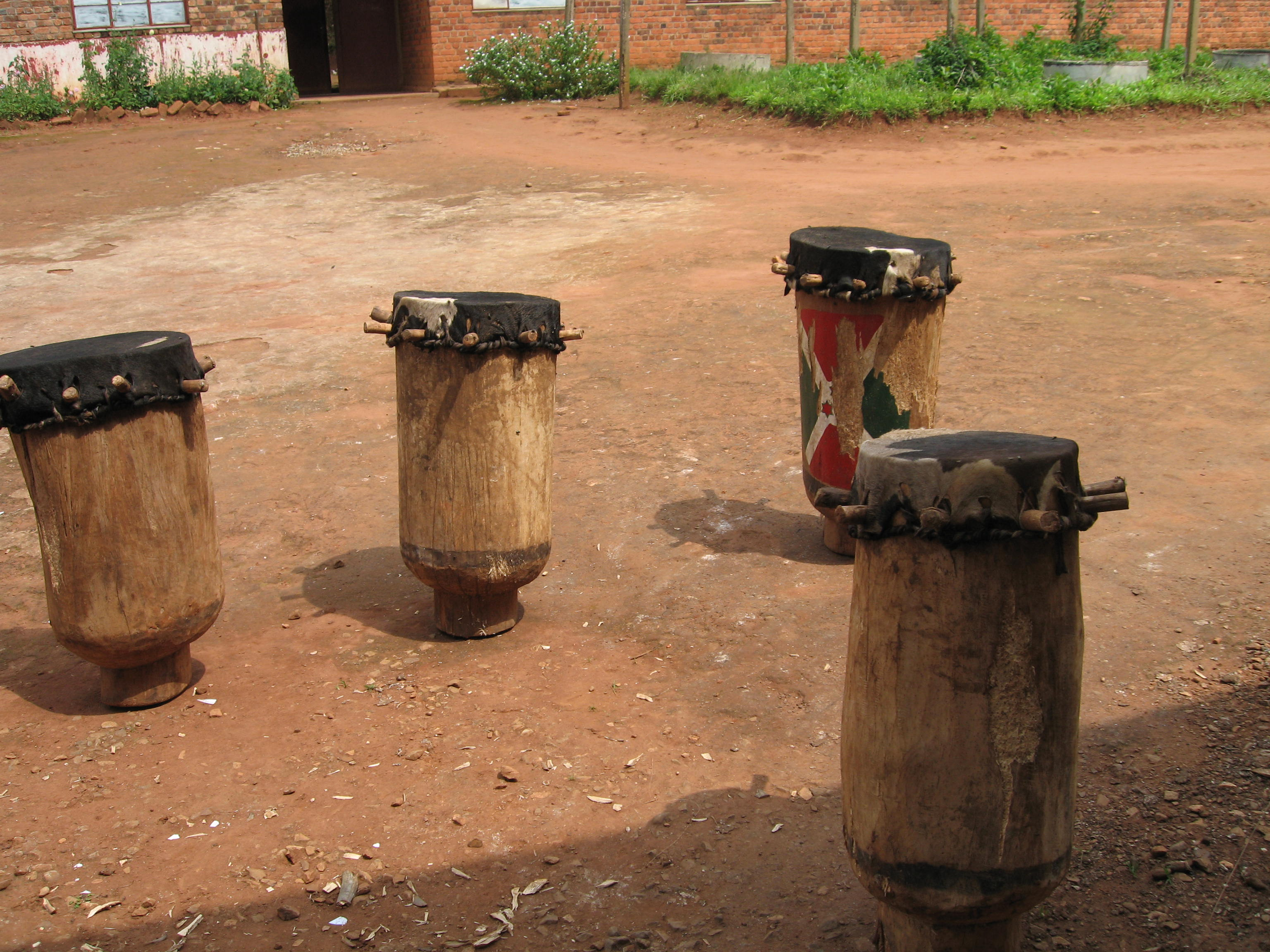
Drums from Gitega, Burundi

Coat of arms of Burundi

=== Identification page ===
- Passport holder photo (Width: 30mm, Height: 40mm, Head height (up to the top of the hair): 75%; Distance from the top of the photo to the top of the hair: 6.25%)
- Type ("P" for passport, "D" for diplomatic)
- Code of the country (BDI)
- Serial number of the passport
- Surname and first name of the passport holder
- Nationality
- Personal identity number
- Date of birth (DD.MM.YYYY)
- Gender (M for men or F for women)
- Place of Birth
- Date of issue (DD.MM.YYYY)
- Issuing authority
- Expiry date (DD.MM.YYYY)
- Passport holder's signature

The identification pages also contain a holographic emblem of the East African Community. On the left top side of the page just above the passport photo, there is a green geographic outline of Burundi. On the top right side there is a holographic miniature version of the passport photo with the serial number of the passport written in it.

The passport photo also has a small concentric message engraved on the top left corner of the photo. The message says : "Republic of Burundi" repeatedly.

== Visa requirements ==
As of September 2026, Burundian citizens had visa-free or visa on arrival access to 48 countries and territories, ranking the Burundian passport 88th in terms of travel freedom (tied with Cameroonian passport) according to the Henley visa restrictions index.

== See also ==
- List of passports
