= Visa policy of Burundi =

Policy on permits required to enter Burundi

Visitors to Burundi may obtain either a visa on arrival or an Online Visa unless they are citizens from one of the visa-exempt countries.

== Visa policy map ==
Visa policy of Burundi Burundi Visa not required (3 months) Visa not required (14 days) Visa on arrival / Online Visa

== Visa exemption ==
=== Ordinary passports ===
Citizens of the following countries may enter Burundi without a visa for the following period:

3 months

- Democratic Republic of Congo^{1}
- Kenya
- Rwanda^{1}
- South Sudan
- Tanzania
- Uganda

14 days

- Hong Kong

_{1 – Also for Economic Community of the Great Lakes Countries laissez-passer holders.}

=== Non-ordinary passports ===
Holders of diplomatic, official or service passports may enter Burundi without a visa for the following period:

90 days within any 180 days

- Russia^{D S}
- Turkey^{D}

30 days

- Brazil^{D O S}
- China^{D O S}
- Singapore^{D O S}

_{D - Diplomatic passports}
_{O - Official passports}
_{PA - Passports for public affairs}
_{S - Service passports}

=== Future changes ===
Burundi has signed visa exemption agreements with the following countries, but they have not yet been ratified or applied:

Country	Passports	Agreement signed on
United Arab Emirates	All	4 January 2019

== Visa on arrival ==
Citizens of other countries and territories may obtain a visa on arrival either at Bujumbura International Airport (Melchior Ndadaye) or at all land borders for a maximum stay of 30 days.

Visa applications may also be completed through the official website of the General Commissariat for Migration.

== Online Visa ==
Citizens of other countries and territories may also obtain online visa good for multiple entries, fees can be paid in USD or Euro.

Validity	Fee
1 month	90 USD
2 months	180 USD
3 months	270 USD

== Transit ==
Passengers with a confirmed onward ticket for a flight to a third country. They must stay in the international transit area of the airport and have documents required for the next destination.

== See also ==
- Visa requirements for Burundian citizens
