= Democratic Republic of the Congo passport =

Travel document

DRC passport
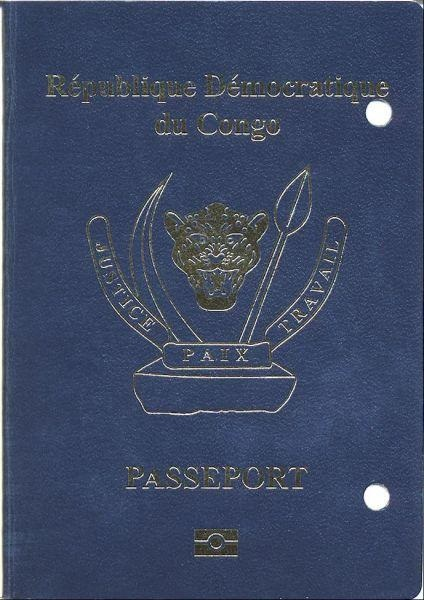
- Front cover of the current DRC passport (with chip)
- Type: Passport
- Issued by: Democratic Republic of the Congo
- First issued: 5 June 2025 (current version)
- Purpose: Identification
- Eligibility: DR Congo citizenship
- Expiration: 5 years after issuance
- Cost: $75

The Democratic Republic of the Congo issues passports to its citizens for international travel.

On 1 January 2010, the Government officially invalidated all passports not of the series OB, even if the expiry date was beyond 1 January 2010. Because passports not of the series OB were no longer considered valid travel documents from that date onwards, holders were obliged to apply for new DRC passports in order to travel.

Under a previous 2015 agreement, the passport cost $185. It was reported that the Congolese government received a share of $65, with the remainder split between the Belgian company Semlex and the Emirati company LRPS. The contract was awarded without a public tender, leading to allegations of ties to then-President Joseph Kabila. However, the fee was reduced to $99 in 2020. After the German company Dermalog was awarded the contract in 2022, the price was further reduced to $75 in 2025.

As of 1 January 2017, Democratic Republic of the Congo citizens had visa-free or visa-on-arrival access to 40 countries and territories, ranking the Democratic Republic of the Congo passport 94th in terms of travel freedom (tied with Djiboutian and North Korean passports) according to the Henley visa restrictions index.

== Visa-free travel ==
Visa requirements for Democratic Republic of the Congo citizens Democratic Republic of the Congo Visa not required Visa on arrival eVisa Visa available both on arrival or online visa required

== See also ==
- Visa requirements for Democratic Republic of the Congo citizens
- List of passports
