= Burundian nationality law =

Nationality Code of Burundi

Parliament of Burundi
- Long title: Loi 1/013 du 18 juillet 2000 portant reforme du code de la nationalité burundaise
- Enacted by: Government of Burundi
- Status: Current legislation

Burundian nationality law is regulated by the Constitution of Burundi, as amended; the Nationality Code of Burundi (French: Code de la nationalité burundaise), and its revisions; and various international agreements to which the country is a signatory. These laws determine who is, or is eligible to be, a national of Burundi. The legal means to acquire nationality, formal legal membership in a nation, differ from the domestic relationship of rights and obligations between a national and the nation, known as citizenship. Burundian nationality is typically obtained under the principle of jus sanguinis, i.e. by birth in Burundi or abroad to parents with Burundian nationality. It can be granted to persons with an affiliation to the country, or to a permanent resident who has lived in the country for a given period of time through naturalization.

== Acquisition of nationality ==
Nationality can be acquired in Burundi through birth or later in life through naturalization.

=== By birth ===
Article 12 of the 2018 Constitution of Burundi provides for gender equality in obtaining nationality in the territory; however, the Nationality Code of 2000 allows children to derive their nationality only from their fathers, unless they are illegitimate or the father is stateless. (Note: Manby notes the discrepancy is with the 2005 Constitution. A review by the Committee on the Elimination of Discrimination against Women confirms a new constitution was adopted in 2018. The 2018 Constitution confirms no change to Article 12, which provides "The children born of Burundian men or women have the same rights in regard to the law of nationality".) In practice, it is typical that only the father's nationality is recognized.

- Persons born anywhere to a Burundian father;
- Persons born anywhere to a Burundian mother, who have not been legitimated or claimed by their father, or whose father is stateless or of unknown nationality; or
- Foundlings or orphans born in the territory of unknown parentage.

=== By naturalization ===
Naturalization can be granted to persons of the age of majority who have resided in the territory for a sufficient period of time to confirm they understand the customs and traditions of the society. General provisions are that applicants be of good character and have no criminal history. To confirm an attachment to the nation, applicants must show that they have an understanding of Kirundi and either own property in the territory, or are engaged in a profession. Nationality may also be granted for service to the nation or under exceptional circumstances. The general residency requirement is ten years, but exceptions can be made for individuals who have performed exemplary services to the nation. Besides foreigners meeting the criteria, other persons who may be naturalized include:

- Persons born to a Burundian mother may declare a choice to obtain her nationality;
- The wife of a Burundian husband acquires his nationality by declaration upon legal marriage;
- The husband of a Burundian wife may naturalize after a five-year residency;
- A minor child upon naturalization of their Burundian parent; or
- Adoptees who are residing in Burundi at the time of adoption and declaration of nationality.

== Loss of nationality ==
Nationality conferred at birth may not be revoked in Burundi. Persons can be denaturalized for committing fraud in a naturalization petition or serving in the military of another state at war with Burundi.

== Dual nationality ==
Burundi has allowed dual nationality since 2000.

== History ==
=== Kingdom of Burundi (1675–1894) ===
The peoples with the longest history in the region were the Twa, who were known for pottery and hunting. Hutu people migrated to the area and engaged in farming. Waves of cattle-raising Tutsi moved south into the region from the fifteenth to sixteenth centuries. By 1625 all three groups were living in and interacting in the area. The Kingdom of Burundi developed under Ntare I of Burundi around 1675. The mwami (king) ruled the area centered around Muramvya assisted by administrators. Chiefs administrated outlying districts and had autonomy to govern, within the framework of the kingdom. The socio-political hierarchy was headed by a king and a class of princes, known as ganwa, followed by attendants of the royal court, and other subjects of the middle and lower classes. Social hierarchy traced descent through the father, thus a child born to a Hutu father and Tsusi mother was Hutu. The place one occupied in the society was dependent on that of the paternal grandfather, regardless of the standing of the other three grandparents. Authority was secured through patronage, in which the king had power and influence over his subjects by offering them protection in exchange for loyalty and allegiance. Of feudal roots, the system was designed to maintain an inexpensive, pliable labor pool, which could be used to maximize production and limit costs, allowing a small elite class to monopolize wealth and power.

The Rundi dynasty was plagued with conflict by the nineteenth century leading to difficulties in consolidating centralized power. The internal struggles led to enemies of Mwezi IV of Burundi aligning with the Germans in their attempts to oust Mwezi from power. The Germans were in the kingdom because of a personal initiative of Carl Peters. Unable to interest Chancellor Otto von Bismarck in his colonization scheme, Peters led the colonization efforts in East Africa by traveling through in 1884 and securing treaties with local sultans in Mbuzini, Nguru, Ukami, Usagara, and Useguha. Peters acquired twelve treaties with the sultans, which in exchange for protection against forces which might be a threat to their domain, granted him and his company the right to colonize, establish trade, and govern their territories. Returning to Germany and presenting these to Bismark, in 1885 an imperial charter was issued to Peters to establish the Society for German Colonization. In 1888, Peters secured an agreement with the Sultan of Zanzibar granting port concessions to German traders, which led to widespread revolt. In 1889, Germany began a military occupation of Burundi and in 1890, Peters turned over control of his colonization company to the German empire. In 1891 after the revolt was suppressed, the Reich declared its authority over the region.

=== German East Africa (1894–1922) ===
In 1894 the German government established German East Africa, which included parts of present-day Burundi, Rwanda, and Tanzania, as a formal colony under its protection. Urundi formally became a protectorate in 1903 when the Treaty of Kiganda was signed by Mwezi IV of Burundi and Friedrich Robert von Beringe. Under the terms of the German Colonial Act of 1888, German colonies were not part of the federal union, but they were also not considered foreign. Thus, laws that were extended to the colonies sometimes treated residents as nationals and other times as foreigners. German law applied to those subjects who had been born in Germany. Native subjects in the colonies were not considered to be German, but were allowed to naturalize. Naturalization required ten years residence in the territory and proof of self-employment. It was automatically bestowed upon all members of a family, meaning children and wives derived the nationality of the husband. The Nationality Law of 1913 changed the basis for acquiring German nationality from domicile to patrilineality, but did not alter derivative nationality. In 1916 during World War I, the Germans were forced to withdraw and the Belgian forces established a military occupation. Three years after the Treaty of Versailles was signed in 1919, Ruanda-Urundi became a League of Nations mandated territory, under the authority of Belgium.

=== Belgian trust territory (1922–1962) ===
The mandate for Ruanda-Urundi was established on 20 July 1922. For administrative purposes, Belgium assigned the administration of the territory to the Governor-General of the Belgian Congo. On 21 August 1925, the Belgian Parliament passed a Bill for the Government of Ruanda-Urundi, which stipulated that though administered by the Governor-General of the Belgian Congo, Ruanda-Urundi was to be on an equal footing with the Congo and was to remain autonomous. With regard to the nationality of the inhabitants of the territory, the 1925 bill stipulated that Ruandan-Rundi natives were neither subjects, nationals, nor citizens of Belgium, but remained subjects of their respective native chiefs. Persons who were Belgian nationals domiciled in the colonies followed Belgian law, which required descent from a Belgian father and unity of nationality for members of a family. From 1932, a wife or child could refuse automatic acquisition of nationality by making a formal declaration. In the case of a wife, her declaration had to be made within six months of marriage and in the case of a child, before the age of twenty-three.

The colonial administration transplanted tens of thousands of the inhabitants of Ruanda-Urundi to the North Kivu area of Belgian Congo to work on agricultural plantations and as miners. They were given identity cards upon arrival in Congo, because they had no nationality, but no agreement between the two areas addressed the question of nationality. However, under the Section 5 of the Belgian Congo Civil Code of 1892 children born within Congo whose parents were foreigners, but domiciled in Congo for a specified period when the child was born were Congolese, as were children born to foreigners in Congo who chose to naturalize at the age of majority. From 1937 to the mid-1950s, under a program known as the Banyarwanda Immigration Mission (French: Mission d'immigration des Banyarwanda), forced migrations took place because of overpopulation and famine in Ruanda-Urundi.

At the end of World War II the United Nations modified the mandates and established Trust Territories. Belgium continued to administrate Ruanda-Urundi from Léopoldville with separated institutions for Congo and Ruanda-Urundi. Initial plans were for Ruanda-Urundi to emerge from the trusteeship as a single state. To that end, a royal decree was issued on 14 July 1952 to reorganize the territory. Under its terms, the mwami remained hereditary and had the authority to appoint chiefs and petty chiefs, but the Governor-General had the right to veto his actions. Though the monarchy was changed by the decree, the mwami retained the power to issue laws to provide for governance and policing without democratic input from his subjects, however, he was bound to consult with the newly established native councils. When Congo gained independence in 1960, there was confusion regarding the status of the imported laborers from Ruanda-Urundi, which would remain an issue of conflict. Failure to negotiate a union, resulted in a UN resolution 1746 (XVI) on 27 June 1962, decreeing two separate states would become independent.

=== Post-independence (1962–present) ===
Under the constitution proclaimed on 23 November 1961, Burundi was established as a monarchy. The Constitution provided in Articles 4 and Article 5 that nationality and naturalization of foreigners were to be defined by law and until that law was drafted, those who were nationals were inhabitants born within the territory or abroad to a Murundi father. Those foreigners who had assimilated to the culture could naturalize and those who wished to repudiate their nationality could do so within two years if they had another nationality. Burundi gained its independence, effective 1 July 1962. A 1966 coup d'état, overthrew the monarchy and brought Michel Micombero to power as the first president of the Republic of Burundi. Two attempted coups occurred in 1969, followed by a violent uprising in 1972. The uprising caused mass exodus forcing many Murundi, to take refuge abroad. Under the 1971 Nationality Law (Law N° 1/93, 10 August), the first nationality codification of the country, many of these refugees who had taken foreign nationality so that they were able to work or have free movement to find work, lost their Burundian status because of prohibitions against dual nationality. Under its provisions a legitimate or legitimated child, born to a Burundian father, or an individual who would have become Burundian except for his death prior to independence, automatically obtained nationality. An illegitimate child could gain Burundian nationality through its mother if the father did not recognize the child or if its mother gained Burundian nationality. A foreign woman could acquire Burundian nationality by marriage if she gave up her prior nationality. There was no requirement for a Murundi woman to lose her nationality, unless her husband's country automatically granted her nationality upon marriage. Husbands of Burundian women were required to naturalize.

A palace revolution in 1976, ousted Micombero. A new constitution was drafted in 1981, but in 1987 Pierre Buyoya seized power, once again leading to violent unrest in the country. In 1991 a new constitution was drafted and approved by referendum the following year. A thwarted coup attempt occurred in 1993 and sparked a return in violence, which by 1994 had turned into civil war. Intervention by neighboring states, including Rwanda, Tanzania, and Uganda, resulted in the Arusha Peace and Reconciliation Agreements being signed on 28 August 2000. That year, the Nationality Code was revised, but it retained gendered discrimination. Under the Nationality Code of 2000, dual nationality was allowed and persons who had formerly lost their nationality because they had acquired foreign status were able to retrieve Burundian nationality. An amendment to the requirements for naturalization was promulgated in 2003, adding conditions to show that applicants had sufficient ties to the country. According to professor and jurist Gerard Niyungeko, political unrest in the country meant that for 30 of the first 40 years of Burundi's independence, they were without a constitution. A new constitution based upon the Arusha Agreements was drafted and approved by a plebiscite held in early 2005. It removed gender discrepancies in attaining nationality, but created conflict with the existing nationality legislation. In a 2019, Universal Periodic Review by the Committee on the Elimination of Discrimination against Women, government officials advised that they were working on draft legislation to eliminate gender discrimination in the Nationality Code and the Code of the Person and the Family.
