= Republic of the Congo passport =

Passport issued to citizens of the Republic of the Congo

- Republic of the Congo passport front cover
- Type: Passport
- Issued by: Republic of the Congo
- Purpose: Identification
- Eligibility: Republic of the Congo citizenship

Republic of the Congo passports are issued to Congolese citizens to travel outside the Republic of the Congo, also known as Congo-Brazzaville.

As of 1 January 2017, Republic of the Congo citizens had visa-free or visa on arrival access to 43 countries and territories, ranking the Republic of the Congo passport 92nd in terms of travel freedom (tied with Jordanian and Liberian passports) according to the Henley visa restrictions index.

== See also ==
- Visa requirements for Republic of the Congo citizens
