= Rwandan passport =

Passport issued to Rwandan citizens

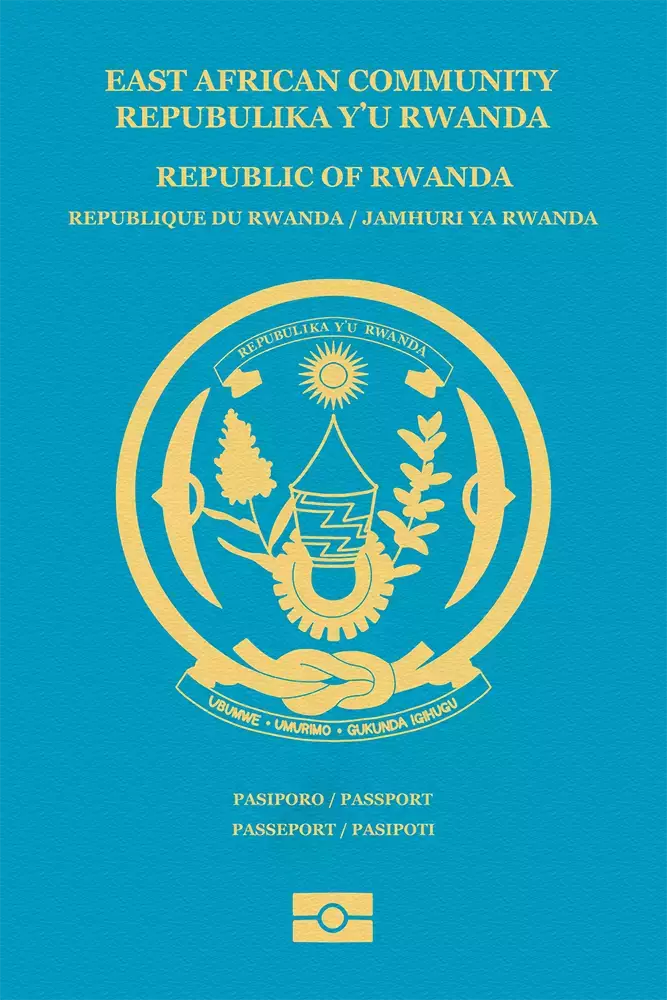
- The front cover of a Rwandan passport
- Type: Passport
- Issued by: Rwanda
- Purpose: Identification and Traveling document Identification
- Valid in: This passport is valid for all countries
- Eligibility: Rwandan citizenship
- Expiration: 5 or 10 years

The Rwandan passport is a passport issued by the Republic of Rwanda to Rwandan citizens for the purpose of international travel. Rwanda started issuing East African Community Biometric Passport also known as e-Passport (with which entry to all east African countries is visa-free) in June 2019 replacing the old ones that will only stay valid until June 2021. The new passports are valid for five years and ten years.

Rwanda has three categories of passports; Ordinary, service, and diplomatic passports,

== Ordinary e-Passport ==
An Ordinary e-passport is issued to any Rwandan who fulfills the necessary requirements to facilitate his/her travels outside the country.

All applications are submitted through IREMBO platform.

- The applicant can approach an IREMBO agent, or do it themselves by accessing the IREMBO platform.
- The applicant will then be notified by the Directorate General of Immigration and Emigration (DGIE), through SMS, to come at DGIE offices for portrait (photo) capture, Both parents must be present.
- Children below 16 years old are not required to give biometrics.
- For collection of child passport, birth certificate must be presented.
- Ordinary passport of 5 years validity cost FRw 75,000, while Ordinary passport of 10 years cost FRw 100,000.

== Service e-Passport ==
The service e-passport is issued to Rwandan nationals or non-nationals (delegates of Rwanda) traveling abroad on official mission.

Applications are submitted through IREMBO platform:

- The applicant can approach IREMBO agent, or do it themselves on the IREMBO platform.
- The applicant will then be notified by the Directorate General of Immigration and Emigration (DGIE), through SMS, to come at DGIE offices to give their biometrics (the 10 fingerprints and the digital photo).
- The applicant will then be issued with the e-passport.

=== Requirements ===
- Copy of National ID.
- One recently taken colored passport size photo with white background.
- A recommendation letter issued by a government institution.
- Payment of FRw 15,000.

== Diplomatic e-Passport ==
The diplomatic e-passport is issued to high ranking officials in the country or to those representing Rwanda abroad and others as may be specified by the ministerial order.

All applications are submitted through IREMBO platform:

- The applicant can approach IREMBO agent, or do it himself to access the platform.
- The applicant is notified by the officer of the Directorate General of Immigration and Emigration (DGIE), through SMS, to come at DGIE to give his biometrics (the 10 fingerprints and the digital photo).
- The day following the biometrics capture, DGIE notifies the applicant to come and pick the passport.

=== Requirements ===
- Copy of National ID
- One recently taken colored passport size photo with white background
- A recommendation letter issued by MOFA or Cabinet resolutions
- Appointment letter
- Payment of FRw 50,000.

Applications are made through IREMBO site. Rwandans travel freely in two neighboring countries Uganda and Kenya with only ID.

As of 1 January 2021, Rwandan citizens had visa-free or visa on arrival access to 62 countries and territories, ranking the Rwandan passport 76th in terms of travel freedom (tied with Bhutanese, Chadian, Chinese and Malian passports) according to the Henley visa restrictions index.

== See also ==
- Visa requirements for Rwandan citizens
- List of passports
