= Visa policy of the Republic of the Congo =

Policy on permits required to enter the Republic of the Congo

Visitors to the Republic of the Congo must obtain a visa from one of the Republic of the Congo diplomatic missions unless they are citizens from one of the visa-exempt countries or citizens who may obtain a visa on arrival.

== Visa policy map ==
Visa policy of the Republic of the Congo The Republic of the Congo Visa not required (90 days) Visa on arrival Visa required

== Visa exemption ==
Citizens of the following countries who hold a biometric passport may enter the Republic of Congo without a visa for up to 90 days:

Sao tome et principe
- Cameroon
- Central African Republic
- Chad
- Equatorial Guinea
- Gabon

A visa is not required for citizens of China provided their normal passports are endorsed "For Public Affairs".

A visa is not required for holders of a V.I.P Invitation letter.

Date of visa changes

Visa-free:

- 23 October 2017: CEMAC countries – Cameroon, Central African Republic, Chad, Equatorial Guinea and Gabon
- 1 January 2027: All African Union countries.

Visa on arrival:

- 9 October 2018: Rwanda and United Arab Emirates

=== Non-ordinary passports ===
Holders of diplomatic or service category passports of Brazil, China,Russia and holders of diplomatic passports of Portugal and Turkey.

=== Future changes ===
The Republic of the Congo has signed visa exemption agreements with the following countries, but they have not yet entered into force:

Country	Passports	Agreement signed on
Angola	Diplomatic, service	March 2015

== Visa on arrival ==
Citizens of the following countries may obtain a visa on arrival:

- Benin
- Burkina Faso
- Côte d'Ivoire
- Mauritania
- Morocco
- Niger
- Rwanda
- Senegal
- Togo
- United Arab Emirates

== Electronic visa (e-Visa) ==
In April 2019, Congolese authorities announced a plan to introduce an electronic visa in August 2019. Visa applications can already be submitted online at the Republic of the Congo embassy in France website.

== Transit ==
Passengers with a confirmed onward ticket for a flight to a third country on the same calendar day. They must stay in the international transit area of the airport and have documents required for the next destination.

== See also ==
- Visa requirements for Republic of the Congo citizens
