= Nigerian passport =

Travel document for Nigerian citizens travelling outside Nigeria

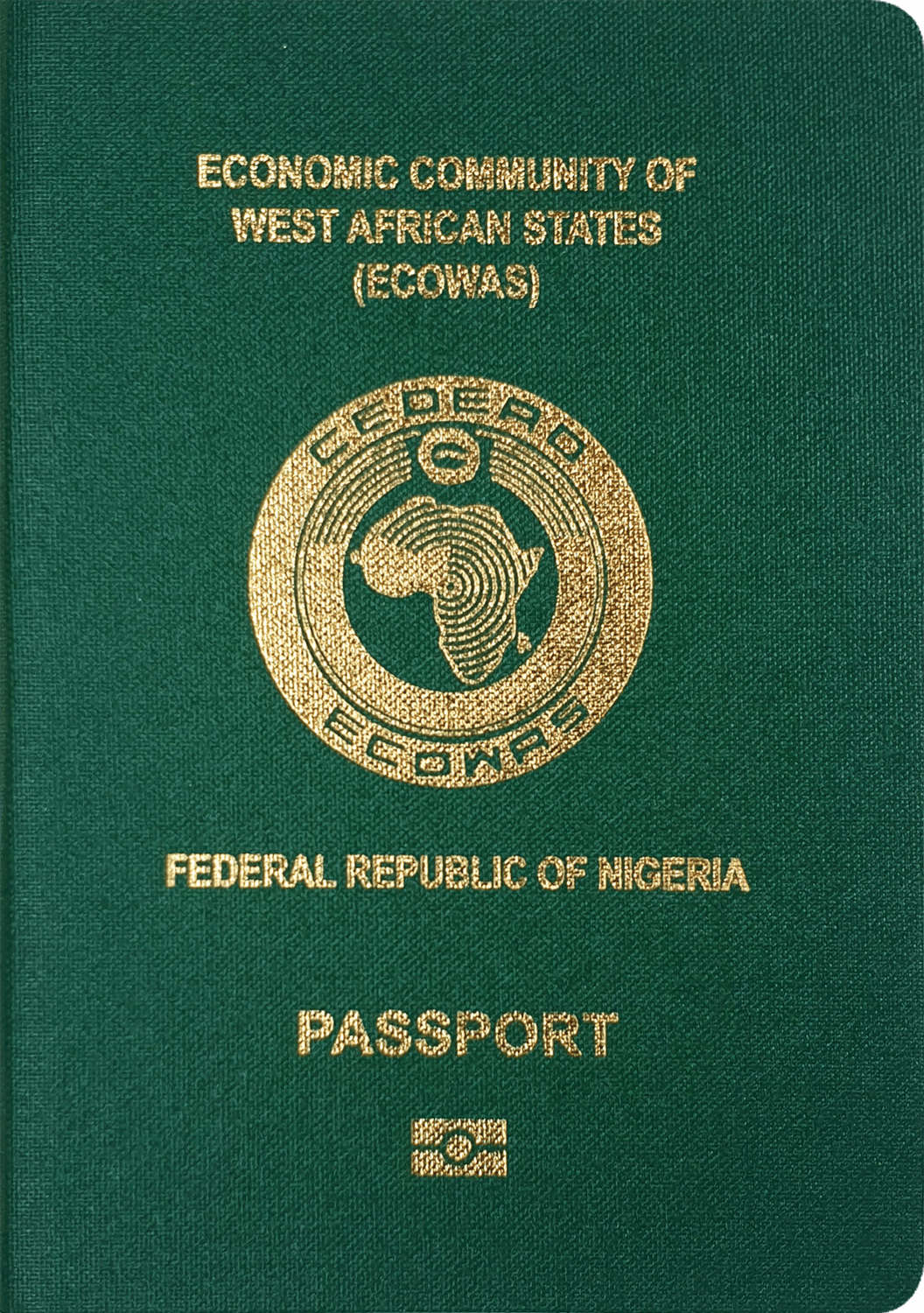
- Front cover of the current Nigerian passport (with chip), issued since January 2019
- Type: Passport
- Issued by: Nigeria Immigration Service
- Purpose: Identification, International travel
- Valid in: All countries
- Eligibility: Nigerian citizenship
- Expiration: 5 or 10 years (Adult); 5 years (Minor)
- Cost: 5 year/32 pages: ₦100,000 (US$150 abroad); 10 year/64 pages: ₦200,000 (US$230 abroad)

Nigerian passports are issued to Nigerian citizens to travel outside of Nigeria. Nigeria now offers only electronic passports for new passport applications. These electronic passports, known also as the e-passport, are classified as either "Standard" or "Official", depending on intended use.

Nigerian passports can be applied for either at the physical location of the Nigeria Immigration Services, or by making submission through its website. Nigerians living in other countries may obtain passports through the nearest Nigerian embassy or consulate. Renewing an already existing passport must be done in person.

== Passport ==
The official e-passport is primarily reserved for certain classes of government officials and Nigerian diplomats.

Nigerian citizens can travel to member states of the Economic Community of West African States (ECOWAS).

On 1 September 2025, the passport fee was set to ₦100,000 for 5-year, 32-page booklets and ₦200,000 for 10-year, 64-page booklets for domestic applications. The previous prices, set in August 2024, were ₦50,000 (up from ₦35,000) and ₦100,000 (up from ₦70,000) respectively. Prices for applying abroad remained unchanged at US$150 and US$230. Some commenters criticised the rises as contributing further to inflation and making the passport unaffordable for many Nigerians, noting that the monthly minimum wage in the country was ₦70,000.

== Visa requirements ==
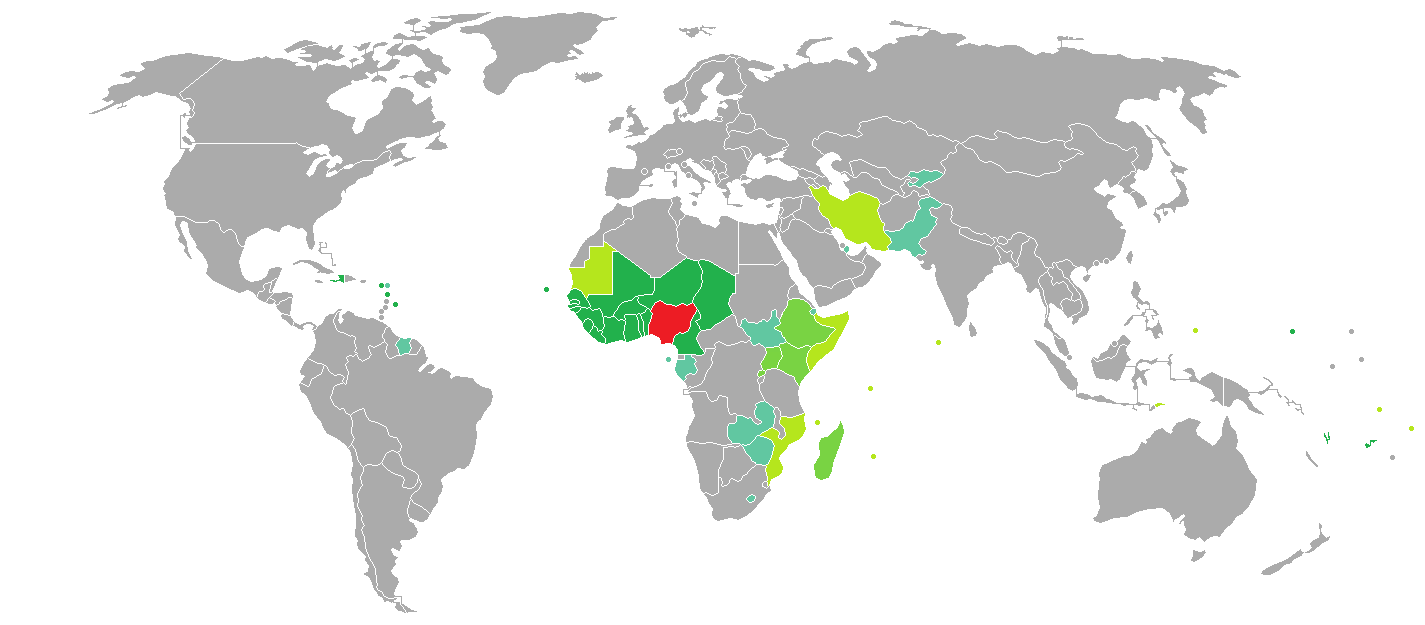
Countries and territories with visa-free or visa on arrival entry for holders of regular Nigerian passports

In 2016, Nigerian citizens had visa-free or visa on arrival access to 66 countries and territories, ranking the Nigerian passport 91st in the world according to the Visa Restrictions Index.

== See also ==
- ECOWAS passports
- List of passports
- Visa requirements for Nigerian citizens
