= Nigerians in the United Arab Emirates =

Nigerians in the UAE النيجيريون في الإمارات العربية المتحدة
- (Nigeria) (United Arab Emirates)
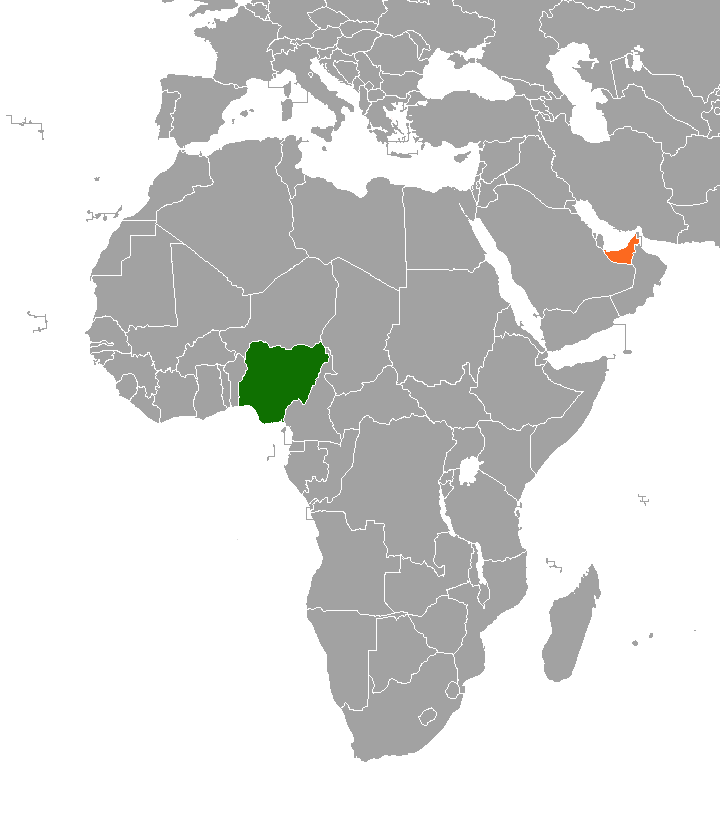

Total population
- 50,000–100,000 (2024 estimate)

Regions with significant populations
- Dubai, Abu Dhabi, Sharjah

Languages
- English (Nigerian English), Igbo, Hausa, Yoruba and other languages of Nigeria; Arabic

Religion
- Predominantly Christianity and Islam

Nigerians in the United Arab Emirates (Arabic: النيجيريون في الإمارات العربية المتحدة) are individuals who were born in the Federal Republic of Nigeria or hold Nigerian nationality and currently reside in the United Arab Emirates (UAE). They form a diverse community, including professionals, students, and businesspeople, and contribute to the social, cultural, and economic life of the country. The United Arab Emirates has become an attractive destination for Nigerian migrants due to its employment opportunities and relatively high standard of living. Many Nigerians are drawn to the country by job prospects in sectors such as hospitality, technology, finance, and trade, as well as the ability to earn higher wages compared to those available in Nigeria. By 2024, the number of Nigerian residents in the UAE was estimated to be between 50,000 and 100,000.

== History ==
The Nigerian community in the United Arab Emirates (UAE) is diverse, comprising professionals, entrepreneurs, and students. While many contribute positively to the UAE's economy and society, a small subset has been involved in illicit activities, including cybercrime. The UAE has been noted as a center for "pig butchering" scams, a type of cryptocurrency investment fraud. Some Nigerians and others have been recruited to run these schemes in Dubai, with reports of coercion and forced confinement, raising concerns about human trafficking and exploitation. These cases represent only a tiny fraction of the community, as most Nigerians in the UAE lead law-abiding lives and actively participate in the country’s multicultural and social landscape.

Since 2021, Nigerian migrant workers in the United Arab Emirates have faced difficulties due to the UAE authorities’ unilateral suspension of the issuance and renewal of work visas for Nigerians. This measure has left thousands of workers in a state of uncertainty, affecting their legal status, employment, and livelihoods. Many have lost their jobs and rely on borrowed funds to extend their stay while awaiting resolution of their visa issues. The situation has drawn attention to the vulnerabilities of Nigerian migrants, who have urged both the UAE and Nigerian authorities to intervene, although official responses have been limited.

== Cultural and religious connections ==
Nigerian Muslims, especially those hailing from Northern Nigeria, share a profound cultural and religious connection that transcends geographical boundaries. This bond is rooted in a shared history, linguistic ties, and a common commitment to Islamic principles. In October 2023, the National Council of Nigerian Muslims Organization (NCNMO) hosted the Islamic Couples Annual Retreat (ICARE) in Dubai, UAE, from October 6 to 9. This retreat, exclusively for Nigerian Muslim couples, aimed to strengthen marital bonds through Islamic teachings, fostering a sense of community and shared values among participants. The event featured a blend of educational sessions, recreational activities, and spiritual guidance, reflecting the organization's commitment to nurturing Islamic family life and promoting unity among Nigerian Muslims abroad.

=== Nigerian culture in Dubai ===
Nigerian migrants in Dubai have actively used cultural performance, particularly music and entertainment, to express their national identity and maintain community cohesion. In commercial and public spaces, such as malls, clubs, and resorts, Nigerian artists and performers showcase Afrobeats and other forms of Nigerian popular culture. These activities allow migrants to assert their cultural presence, counter negative stereotypes, and create networks of social and economic support within the diaspora. The phenomenon also illustrates how Nigerian culture has become globally mobile, contributing to Dubai’s multicultural landscape while providing Nigerians abroad with a sense of belonging and recognition.
