= Cape Verdean passport =

Passport issued to citizens of Cape Verde

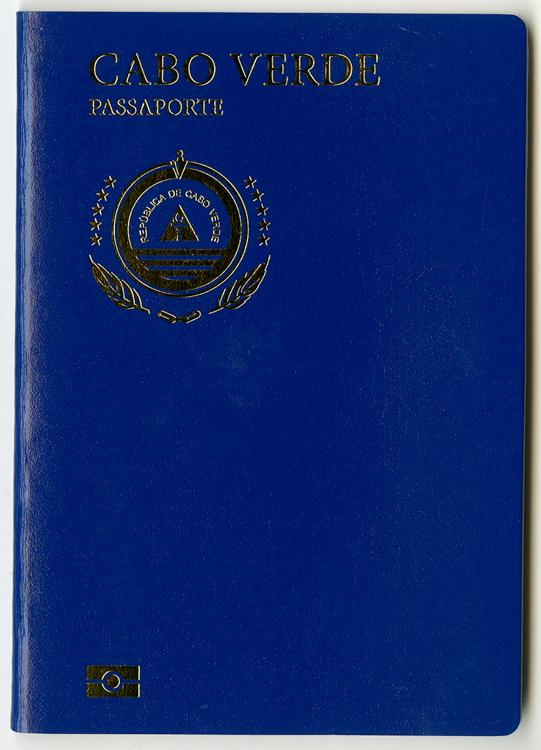
- Front cover of the current Cape Verdean passport (with chip)
- Type: Passport
- Issued by: Cape Verde
- Purpose: Identification
- Eligibility: Cape Verdean citizenship

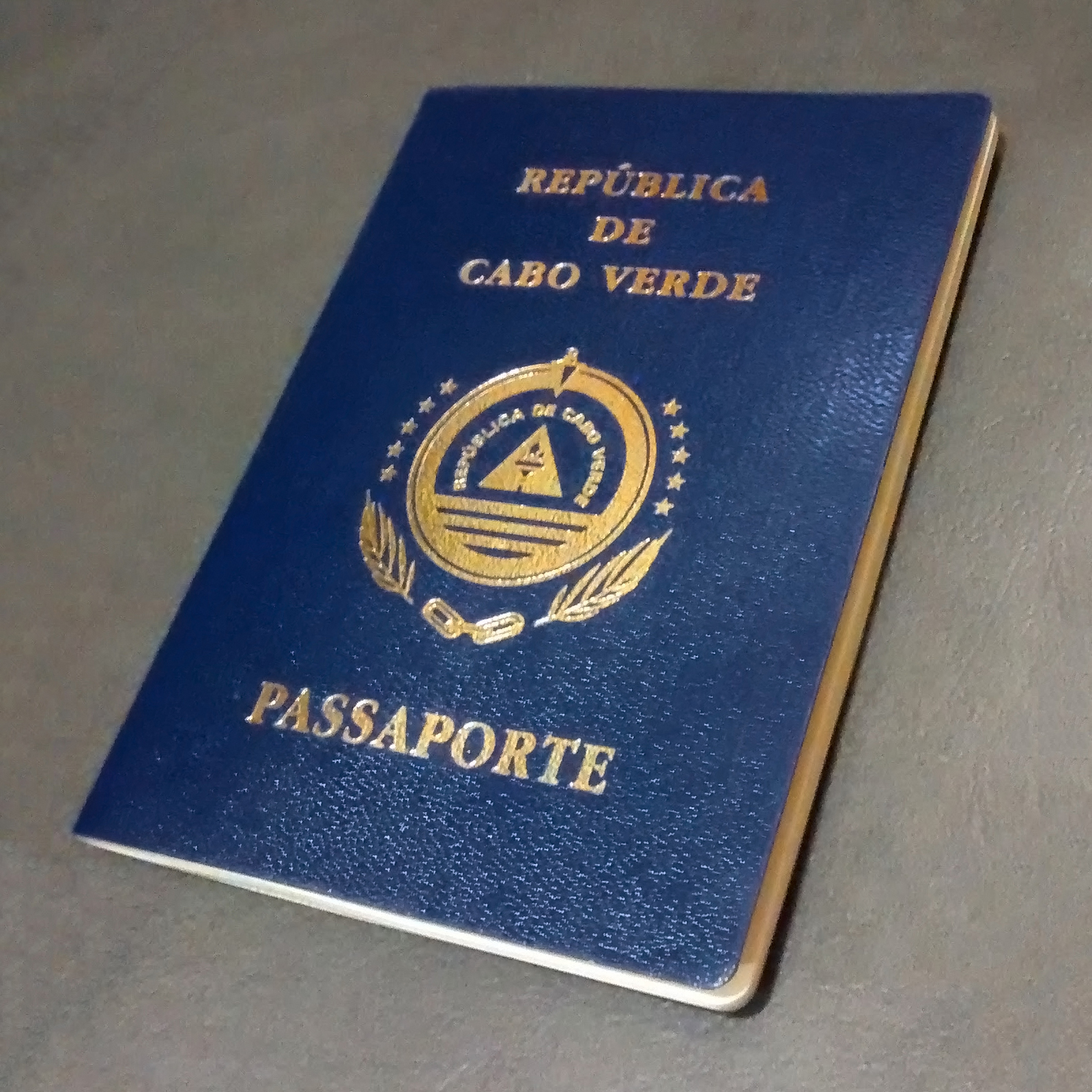
An old prebiometric Cape Verdean passport

The Cape Verdean passport is issued to citizens of Cape Verde for international travel. Cape Verdean citizens can travel to member states of the Economic Community of West African States (ECOWAS) visa-free.

== Physical properties ==
- Surname
- Given names
- Nationality Cape Verdean
- Date of birth
- Sex
- Place of birth
- Date of Expiry
- Passport number
- Authority

== Languages ==
The data page/information page is printed in Portuguese and English.

== See also ==
- ECOWAS passports
- Visa requirements for Cape Verdean citizens
- List of passports
