= Liberian passport =

Passport issued to citizens of Liberia

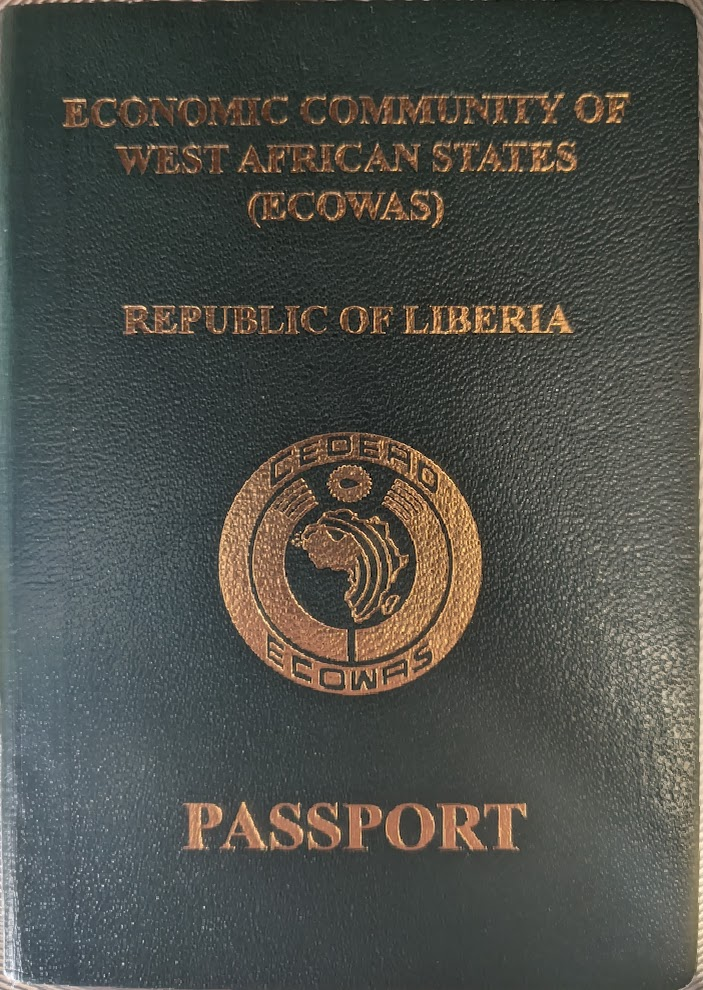
- Type: Passport
- Issued by: Liberia
- First issued: 9 August 2017 (current version)
- Purpose: Identification
- Eligibility: Liberian citizenship

Liberian passports are issued to Liberian citizens to travel outside Liberia.

== Physical properties ==
- Surname
- Given names
- Nationality Liberian
- Date of birth
- Sex
- Place of birth
- Date of Expiry
- Passport number
- Height
- County of origin
- NID number

== Languages ==
The data page/information page is printed in English and French.

== Visa-free or visa-on-arrival access ==
Liberia is a member of the Economic Community of West African States (ECOWAS), so Liberian citizens have visa-free access to the other 11 member states:

- Benin
- Cape Verde
- Gambia
- Ghana
- Guinea
- Guinea-Bissau
- Ivory Coast
- Nigeria
- Senegal
- Sierra Leone
- Togo

In addition to the list above, the Liberian passport grants visa-free access to 11 other countries and visa-on-arrival access to 34 countries.

== Passport Types ==
The Republic of Liberia issues three main passports to its citizens:

- Ordinary passport. The ordinary passport is issued to all citizens. This passport is dark green in color. It bears the emblem of ECOWAS on the first page and that of Liberia on the last page. The ordinary passport is valid for 5 years.
- Diplomatic Passport is issued to Liberian diplomats accredited abroad and their eligible dependents. This passport is red in color. It is issued for 2 years.
- Official Passport is issued to civil servants attached to government institutions who must travel for official reasons. This passport has a dark red cover and is issued for 2 years.

== See also ==
- ECOWAS passports
- List of passports
- Liberian nationality law
- Visa requirements for Liberian citizens
