= ECOWAS passport =

Common passport document for several countries in West Africa

Economic Community of West African States (ECOWAS): Comunidade Económica dos Estados da África Ocidental (Portuguese); Communauté économique des États de l'Afrique de l'Ouest (French)
- Map of Africa indicating the ECOWAS member states.

Passports issued by the member states of ECOWAS follow a similar design, used by several countries in West Africa. Member states of ECOWAS — the Economic Community of West African States — have implemented a common design for the passport. It was created to facilitate the intra-regional travel of member states' citizens for periods of unlimited duration. The passport can be used within the sub-region and is also recognized for international travel.

== Types ==
There are three types of passports of ECOWAS member countries:

Ordinary passport
These passports are issued to citizens and are intended for occasional travel, such as vacations and business trips. They contain 32 pages, and are valid for 5 years.

Official/Service passport
These passports are issued to officials attached to government institutions who have to travel on official business.

Diplomatic passport
Issued to diplomats and consuls for work-related travel, and to their accompanying dependents.

== Common design features ==
=== Overall format ===
- Paper size B7 (ISO/IEC 7810 ID-3, 88 mm × 125 mm)
- 32 pages (passports with more pages can be issued to frequent travelers)
- Colour of cover: green, blue and burgundy (depending on type of passport)

=== Cover ===
The Economic Community of West African States (ECOWAS) itself does not issue passports, but the passports issued by its 15 members share certain design features. These include the green coloured cover for ordinary passports, blue colored cover for service passports, and burgundy colored cover for diplomatic passports, as well as common security features and biometrics.

Additional common features include the inscription of the words "Economic Community of West African States" (French: Communauté économique des États de l'Afrique de l'Ouest (CEDEAO)), depending on the language of the issuing state. While the emblem of the ECOWAS community is emblazoned on the cover page of some passports, it is possible to notice some ECOWAS passports of certain countries with the respective state’s emblem on the cover instead. The name of the issuing country is usually the only distinguishing factor between passports issued by the various sovereign nations of the sub-region.

Near the bottom of the passport cover, depending on the official language of the issuing state, the words "Passport" (French: Passeport) are inscribed on ordinary passports, "Official Passport" or "Service Passport" (Passeport de service) on service passports; and "Diplomatic Passport" (Passeport diplomatique) on diplomatic passports.

=== Identification page ===
The following information is printed on the identification page, in both English and French:

1. Type
2. Code of Issuing State
3. Passport No.
4. Surname
5. Given name(s)
6. Nationality
7. Date of birth
8. Sex
9. Place of birth
10. Date of issue
11. Date of expiry
12. Authority

== Overview of passports issued by the ECOWAS states ==
ECOWAS state	Passport cover	Visa requirements	Cost	Validity	Issuing authority	Latest version
Benin			30,000 CFA	6 years	Direction de l'Émigration et de l'Immigration (D.E.I.)	2016
Burkina Faso			46,000 CFA	5 years	Direction Générale de la Police Nationale	2013
Cape Verde			5,000 CVE	5 years	DEF	2005
(The Gambia); Gambia			1000.00 D	5 years	Gambia Immigration Department	2002
Ghana			GH₵50	5 years	Passport Office	2010
Guinea			500,000 GNF	5 years	Police de l’air et des frontières (PAF)	2018
Guinea-Bissau			50,000 XOF	5 years	Serviço de Migração e Fronteiras	
(Ivory Coast); Côte d'Ivoire			40,000 CFA	5 years	Police de l’air et des frontières (PAF)	2008
Liberia			$50 (in Liberia) $205 (Overseas)	5 years	Liberian Passport Office	2017
Mali			85 €	5 years	Direction de la Police des Frontière	2016
Niger			30,000 XOF	5 years	Direction Générale de la Surveillance du Territoire	
Nigeria			₦ 15,000 (Standard, in Nigeria) $ 94 (Standard, Overseas)	10 years	The Nigeria Immigration Service	2019
Senegal			20,000 CFA	5 years	Direction de l'Automatisation des Fichiers	2007
Sierra Leone			Le 750,000	5 years	Immigration Department	2004
Togo			30,000 CFA	5 years	Direction Générale de la Documentation Nationale (DGDN)	2012

== See also ==
- African Union Passport
