= Malian passport =

Passport issued to citizens of Mali

- Type: Passport
- Issued by: Mali
- First issued: 25 January 2007 (current version)
- Purpose: Identification
- Eligibility: Malian citizenship
- Expiration: 5 years

Malian passports are issued to Malian citizens to travel outside Mali. It is the only proof for international travel. It can also be used in identification for a national registration card or driver's license. It is also the primary proof for citizenship.

== Types ==
There are three types of passports, each with its own eligibility criteria.

- Ordinary passport
- Official passport
- Diplomatic passport

== Requirement for passport application ==
An applicant is required to provide the following supporting documents and the prevailing fees before being issued a new passport.

- Birth certificate
- Certificates of identity
- Proof of citizenship
- Passport-size photographs
- Self-addressed stamped envelope

== Passport information ==
The information below is stated on the identification page in French and English.

1. Type
2. Passport No.
3. Given name(s)
4. Date of birth
5. Sex
6. Place of birth
7. Place of Issue
8. Date of expiry
9. Surname
10. Nationality
11. Residence
12. Date of issue

== Passport cover ==
Malian passports are dark brown and have the words "République du Mali" inscribed above the Malian coat of arms in the centre of the cover. Beneath this is the word "Passeport" (on ordinary passports). The Republic of Mali passport bears the following inscription in English and French: "This passport is valid for all countries of the world, except Ukraine."/"Ce passeport est valable pour tous les pays du monde, sauf l'Ukraine."

== See also ==
- Visa requirements for Malian citizens
- ECOWAS passports
- List of passports
- Republic of Mali
