= Visa policy of Nigeria =

Policy on permits required to enter Nigeria

Visitors to Nigeria require a visa unless they come from one of the visa-exempt countries. All visitors must hold a passport valid for 6 months.

== Visa policy map ==
Visa policy of Nigeria Nigeria Visa not required (90 days) eVisa Visa required (de facto)

== Visa exemption ==
Citizens of the following countries may enter Nigeria without a visa for up to 90 days:

- All ECOWAS member states

- Burkina Faso
- Cameroon
- Chad
- Mali
- Niger
- Saint Kitts and Nevis
- Seychelles

Date of visa changes
- Unknown: Cameroon, Chad, Seychelles
- 30 April 1980: Economic Community of West African States (ECOWAS): Benin, Burkina Faso, Cape Verde, Gambia, Ghana, Guinea, Guinea-Bissau, Ivory Coast, Liberia, Mali, Niger, Senegal, Sierra Leone, Togo
- 4 August 2025: Saint Kitts and Nevis

Cancelled:

- Unknown: Morocco

- Visa is not required for former nationals of Nigeria holding a valid foreign passport together with expired Nigerian passport.
- Holders of diplomatic or service category passports issued to nationals of Brazil, China, Namibia, Singapore and South Africa do not require a visa to enter Nigeria.
- Holders of diplomatic passports issued to nationals of Turkey do not require a visa to enter Nigeria.
- Nationals of China holding passports for public affairs do not require a visa for a maximum stay of 30 days.

Visa waiver agreements for diplomatic and official/service passport holders were signed with Vietnam in October 2019 and with Ethiopia in February 2020.

== Landing Card ==
All visitors, whether they require a visa or not, must obtain a landing card before departure.

== Electronic visa (e-Visa) ==
Nigeria introduced an e-Visa system on 1 May 2025, granting non-renewable short-term visas across various categories, including business and tourism, with a stated processing time of 48 hours. Prices vary from 50$ for African countries to 300$ for Western countries. Due to a bilateral agreement, citizens of Singapore may obtain Nigerian e-visas free of charge.

Previously, holders of a written e-Visa approval issued by Immigration Authority Headquarters in Abuja could obtain a visa on arrival for business travel, provided they held a visa application form, e-Visa application payment receipt, and an invitation letter from Nigerian company accepting immigration responsibilities. A simplified e-Visa process was announced in July 2024.

A number of countries are not listed as an option on the Nigeria e-Visa website during the application and therefore must obtain visas from an embassy in advance of travel. Citizens of the following countries are not eligible:

- Afghanistan
- Iran
- Iraq
- Libya
- Montenegro
- Micronesia
- North Korea
- Palestine
- Russia
- Samoa
- Somalia
- South Sudan
- Sudan
- Turkey
- Yemen

== See also ==
- Visa requirements for Nigerian citizens
- Tourism in Nigeria
