= Visa policy of Cape Verde =

Policy on permits required to enter Cape Verde

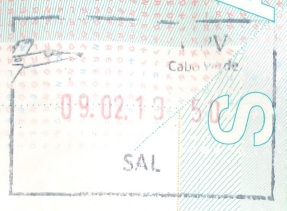
Entry stamp

Visitors to Cape Verde must obtain a visa unless they are citizens from one of the visa-exempt countries, which are mostly in Africa, Europe and the American continent. Visa may be obtained in advance from a Cape Verde embassy or consulate, or in person upon arrival at any of the international airports.

== Visa policy map ==
Visa policy of Cape Verde Cape Verde Visa not required (90 days) Visa not required (60 days) Visa not required (30 days) Visa on arrival Visa required

== Visa exemption ==
EASE portal
- Owner: Government of Cape Verde
- Website: www.ease.gov.cv

Citizens of the following countries and territories may enter Cape Verde without a visa. They must pre-register online on the EASE portal, preferably five days prior to arrival and also pay the airport security fee of CVE 3400 either online or on arrival:

90 days

- All ECOWAS member states
- Burkina Faso
- Hong Kong
- Macau
- Mali
- Mauritania
- Morocco
- Mozambique
- Niger
- Singapore

60 days

- Russia

30 days

- All European Union member states
- Andorra
- Angola^{#}
- Brazil
- Canada
- Iceland
- Liechtenstein
- Monaco
- Norway
- San Marino
- Switzerland
- Timor-Leste
- Vatican City
- United Kingdom
- United States

_{# - Limited to a maximum stay of 90 days per calendar year.}

Date of visa changes
- Unknown: Angola, Hong Kong, Macau, Mauritania, Mozambique, Singapore
- 30 April 1980: ECOWAS (Economic Community of West African States): Benin, Burkina Faso, Gambia, Ghana, Guinea, Guinea-Bissau, Ivory Coast, Liberia, Mali, Niger, Nigeria, Senegal, Sierra Leone, Togo
- 21 July 2014: Timor-Leste
- 1 January 2019: Austria, Belgium, Bulgaria, Croatia, Cyprus, Czech Republic, Denmark, Estonia, Finland, France, Germany, Greece, Hungary, Iceland, Ireland, Italy, Latvia, Liechtenstein, Lithuania, Luxembourg, Malta, Netherlands, Norway, Poland, Portugal, Romania, Slovakia, Slovenia, Spain, Sweden, Switzerland, United Kingdom
- 24 February 2020: Brazil, Canada, United States
- 4 July 2020: Russia
- 8 May 2024: Morocco

Cancelled:

- 1 January 2026: 96 countries (as Visa on arrival)

A visa is not required for holders of diplomatic, official and service passports of any country (except Afghanistan) for 90 days.

A visa is not required for former citizens of Cape Verde and their spouses and children.

== Visa on arrival ==
Citizens from the following countries may obtain a visa on arrival at Sal, Boa Vista, São Vicente or Santiago international airports. They must pre-register online on the EASE portal, preferably five days prior to arrival and also pay the airport security fee of CVE 3400 either online or on arrival.

- Albania
- Argentina
- Australia
- Bahamas
- Barbados
- Belize
- Bosnia and Herzegovina
- Cameroon
- China
- Cuba
- Equatorial Guinea
- Fiji
- Grenada
- India
- Israel
- Japan
- Kenya
- Kuwait
- Malaysia
- Maldives
- Marshall Islands
- Mauritius
- Micronesia
- Moldova
- Montenegro
- New Zealand
- North Macedonia
- Qatar
- Rwanda
- São Tomé and Príncipe
- Saudi Arabia
- Serbia
- Seychelles
- Solomon Islands
- South Korea
- Taiwan
- Thailand
- Turkey
- Ukraine
- United Arab Emirates
- Uruguay

== See also ==
- Visa requirements for Cape Verdean citizens
