= Visa policy of Mali =

Policy on permits required to enter Mali

Visitors to Mali must obtain a visa from one of the Malian diplomatic missions unless they come from one of the visa exempt countries.

== Visa policy map ==
Visa policy of Mali Mali Visa-free access Visa on arrival Visa required Admission refused

== Visa exemption ==
Citizens of the following countries and territories can visit Mali without a visa:

- All ECOWAS member states
- Algeria (3 months)
- Burkina Faso
- Chad (3 months)
- Hong Kong (14 days)
- Indonesia (30 days)
- Macau (30 days)
- Mauritania (3 months)
- Morocco (3 months)
- Niger
- Tunisia (3 months)
- United Arab Emirates (90 days)

Date of visa changes
- Unknown: Algeria, Burkina Faso, Cameroon, Chad, Macao, Mauritania, Morocco, Niger, Tunisia, and United Arab Emirates
- 30 April 1980: ECOWAS (Economic Community of West African States): Benin, Burkina Faso, Cape Verde, Gambia, Ghana, Guinea, Guinea-Bissau, Ivory Coast, Liberia, Niger, Nigeria, Senegal, Sierra Leone, Togo
- 2015: Andorra, Monaco
- 2016: Indonesia
- 16 August 2017: Kenya and Rwanda (resumed as Visa on arrival, but Kenya unknown date canceled)
- July 2025: Hong Kong

Canceled:

- March 2015: All countries (as Visa on arrival, but Kenya and Rwanda was resumed 16 August 2017)
- Unknown: Kenya (as Visa on arrival)

Holders of diplomatic and service category passports of Brazil, China, Cuba, Russia and Rwanda do not require a visa for a maximum period of 90 days.
Nationals of any country with a diplomatic and service passports do not require a visa for a maximum period of up to 1 month.
Nationals of China holding passports for public affairs do not require a visa for a maximum stay of 90 days.

Visa exemption agreement for diplomatic, service, official passports was signed with South Africa but not yet ratified.

== Visa on arrival ==
Nationals of Rwanda may apply for a visa on arrival for a maximum stay of 3 months. Up until 9 March 2015, many countries were also eligible for visa on arrival.

== Syria and United States ==
Entry and transit is refused to Syria and United States nationals, even if not leaving the aircraft and proceeding by the same flight.

== Visitor statistics ==
Most visitors arriving to Mali for tourism purposes were from the following countries of nationality:

Country	2014	2013
France	31,580	21,717
Senegal	8,308	7,464
Côte d’Ivoire	7,632	6,432
United States	4,479	3,946
Burkina Faso	3,793	3,402
Guinea	3,508	3,816
China	3,201	2,687
Netherlands	2,299	637
Congo	2,036	1,582
Ghana	2,003	1,707
Total	110,529	85,315

== See also ==
- Visa requirements for Malian citizens
