= Cape Verdean nationality law =

Cape Verdean Nationality Law

Parliament of Cape Verde
- Long title: Lei nº 80/III/90, de 29 de junio de 1990: Lei da Nacionalidade, condições de atribuição, aquisição, perda e reaquisição da nacionalidade cabo-verdiana
- Enacted by: Government of Cape Verde
- Status: Current legislation

Cape Verdean nationality law is regulated by the Constitution of Cape Verde, as amended; the Nationality Act, and its revisions; and various international agreements to which the country is a signatory. These laws determine who is, or is eligible to be, a national of Cape Verde. The legal means to acquire nationality, formal legal membership in a nation, differ from the domestic relationship of rights and obligations between a national and the nation, known as citizenship. Cape Verdean nationality is typically obtained under the principle of jus sanguinis, i.e. by birth in Cape Verde or abroad to parents with Cape Verdean nationality. It can be granted to persons with an affiliation to the country, or to a permanent resident who has lived in the country for a given period of time through naturalization.

== Obtaining Cape Verdean nationality ==
Nationality can be obtained in Cape Verde at birth or later in life through naturalization.

=== By birth ===
Typically, in Cape Verde, a combination of jus sanguinis and jus soli are used to determine nationality at birth. Those who are eligible include:

- Persons born in Cape Verde whose parents have been legal permanent residents for at least five years;
- Persons born anywhere who have at least one grandparent who had Cape Verdean nationality;
- Foundlings or orphans, with no discernible evidence as to the nationality or identity of its parents; or
- Persons born in Cape Verde who would otherwise be stateless.

=== By naturalization ===
Cape Verdean nationality may be acquired through application for persons who have reached the age of majority and have legal capacity to the Ministry responsible for immigration. They must provide documentation to confirm lack of a serious criminal record, lack of political service to a government or foreign military, and sufficient resources to provide for their own support. Applicants must verify residency of a minimum of five years, which can be waived in the event of substantial investment towards the development of the country. Besides foreigners meeting the criteria, other persons who may apply for naturalization include:

- The spouse of a Cape Verdean national;
- Children of a naturalized Cape Verdean;
- Persons who have Cape Verdean ancestry can naturalize without a residency period;
- Adoptees of Cape Verdean nationals, or their parents, can request nationality; or
- Persons who previously lost their nationality and wish to reacquire it.

== Loss of nationality ==
Cape Verdeans are allowed to renounce their nationality. Prior to 1992, the nationality law required denaturalization for dual nationality.

== Dual nationality ==
Cape Verde has allowed dual nationality since 1992. The only restriction on dual nationality is that the president must hold only Cape Verdean nationality.

== History ==
=== Portuguese colony (1460–1975) ===
What is known as the Cape Verde archipelago was sighted by several Italian mariners sailing under the Portuguese flag. They included António de Noli of Genoa in July 1455, Antoniotto Usodimare also a Genoan, and Alvise Cadamosto of Venice in May 1456, all of whom represented prince Henry the Navigator. By 1460, the Barlavento and Sotavento Islands were completely charted through efforts of Diogo Afonso, Diogo Gomes, de Noli, and his brother Bartólomeu, and a settlement was established on São Tiago Island by de Noli. When explorers made landfall, they reported that the islands were uninhabited. Under the Ordinances of Manuel I (Portuguese: Ordenações Manuelinas), compiled by Portugal in 1521, courts were given leeway to interpret common law and local custom in the territories without established High Courts. Nationals were defined as those born in Portuguese territory and leaving the territory without permission of the sovereign was grounds for denaturalization. In 1603, the Ordinances of Philip I (Portuguese: Ordenações Filipinas) established that Portuguese nationals were children born on the Iberian Peninsula or adjacent islands, Brazil, or to an official in service to the crown in the Portuguese possessions of Africa or Asia, whose father was a native of Portugal, or whose mother was a native of Portugal and whose father was a foreigner who had established domicile in Portugal for a minimum of ten years. Those who were not in service to the crown in the colonies (except Brazil) were not considered to be Portuguese. A child could not derive nationality directly from its mother unless it was illegitimate.

The first Constitution of Portugal, drafted in 1822, defined subjects of the Portuguese crown as the children of a male, native to any of the territories of the kingdom. The nationality scheme laid out in 1603 remained mostly unchanged except for some clarifications, such as legitimate children of a Portuguese father or illegitimate children of a Portuguese mother born abroad could be nationals if they resided in Portugal and children born to a Portuguese mother and foreign father could only derive Portuguese nationality upon reaching their majority and requesting it. Two new provisions included that foundlings discovered on Portuguese soil were considered nationals, as were freedmen. Naturalization was only available to foreign men who married Portuguese women, and only if they had investments in the country or provided service to the crown. Denaturalization resulted from service to, or receiving benefits from, a foreign government, or obtaining other nationality. A new constitution was adopted in 1826 (which was in force from 1826 to 1828, 1834 to 1836, and 1842 to 1910) which granted nationality to anyone born on Portuguese soil. Birth by descent was accepted as establishing nationality, as long as the father lived in Portugal or was abroad in service to the monarch. Provisions stipulated that only illegitimate children could derive nationality from their mother and established that a nationality law was to define provisions for naturalization.

The new nationality code was promulgated as the Decree of 22 October 1836, which established that grounds for naturalization included having reached majority, demonstrating adequate means of self-support, and having a minimum of two years residency, which could be waived if one had Portuguese ancestry. The Civil Code of 1867 reiterated similar nationality requirements to those that had previously been in effect, with the exception that a foreign woman, upon marriage to a Portuguese husband, automatically acquired Portuguese nationality. It also provided that Portuguese women who married foreigners lost their nationality, unless they would become stateless, and could not reacquire Portuguese status unless the marriage terminated and she lived in Portugal. It retained the provisions of the 1836 Decree for naturalization but increased residency to three years and added stipulations that applicants must have completed their military duties to their country of origin and that they have no criminal record. The Indigenous Code (Portuguese: código indígenato) of 1899, which applied to all other Portuguese colonies, was inapplicable in Cape Verde and São Tomé and Príncipe. The nationality requirements remained stable and did not significantly change again until 1959, when a new Nationality Law (Lei n.º 2098), granted Portuguese nationality to anyone born in Cape Verde, unless the parents were foreign diplomats. Married women continued to derive their nationality from their husband, with the exception that a woman could retain her nationality of origin if she specifically declared she did not want to be Portuguese and could prove that her country of origin allowed retention of her nationality after marriage.

After the collapse of the Estado Novo dictatorship in Portugal in 1974 and following a lengthy struggle for independence of the colonies, Portugal agreed to begin the process of decolonization. By the Decree of 25 April 1974, the Portuguese Parliament created the African countries of Angola, Cape Verde, Guinea Bissau, Mozambique, and São Tomé e Principe. In December 1974, Portugal signed an agreement for Cape Verde's independence, if the populace agreed. In an attempt to settle the nationality question of those in the new countries, Portugal promulgated Decree-Law 308/75 on 24 June 1975. Under its terms, the legislation assumed that Cape Verdeans and others born in the colonies would become nationals of the new countries if they did not declare a preference to retain their Portuguese nationality. It proclaimed that those who would not lose Portuguese nationality at independence included only persons born in Portugal but living abroad and persons born abroad in the territory but who had established long-term ties with Portuguese culture by living in Portugal. No option was offered to other Portuguese nationals to retain their status and the automatic loss of nationality left many former colonial nationals stateless. In the July 1975 elections, independence was endorsed for Cape Verde.

=== Post-independence (1975–present) ===
The transitional government installed on 5 July 1975, promulgated the Organic Law of Political Organization, which would serve in place of a constitution until 1980. The Nationality Law (Decreto-7 Lei no.71/76) adopted on 24 July 1976, provided equal acquisition of nationality for spouses and children of Cape Verdean nationals. Children born anywhere to parents who were Cape Verdean had Cape Verdean nationality, as did the children born in the country to foreigners, excluding diplomats, and children who would otherwise be stateless. It also contained reciprocal nationality arrangements for persons from Cape Verde and Guinea-Bissau, because of their shared history in the independence movement through Amílcar Cabral's African Party for the Independence of Guinea and Cape Verde (Portuguese: Partido africano de independência da Guiné e Cabo Verde (PAIGC)). On 13 September 1976, Cape Verde adopted additional legislation (Lei No.51/VI/2004) to provide for the special registration of undocumented Cape Verdeans who had resided in Angola or East Timor prior to independence. In 1990, the Nationality Law was redrafted to provide for adopted children and in 1992, it was amended to allow for dual nationality.
