= Nigerian nationality law =

Constitution of Nigeria, Chapter III: Citizenship

Parliament of Nigeria
- Enacted by: President of Nigeria
- Status: Current legislation

Nigerian nationality law is regulated by the Constitution of Nigeria, as amended, and various international agreements to which the country is a signatory. These laws determine who is, or is eligible to be, a national of Nigeria. The legal means to acquire nationality, formal legal membership in a nation, differ from the domestic relationship of rights and obligations between a national and the nation, known as citizenship. Nationality describes the relationship of an individual to the state under international law, whereas citizenship is the domestic relationship of an individual within the nation. Commonwealth countries often use the terms nationality and citizenship as synonyms, despite their legal distinction and the fact that they are regulated by different governmental administrative bodies. Nigerian nationality is typically obtained under the principal of jus sanguinis, i.e. by birth to parents with Nigerian nationality. It can be granted to persons with an affiliation to the country, or to a permanent resident who has lived in the country for a given period of time through naturalisation.

As Commonwealth citizens, Nigerians are eligible to vote in UK elections and serve in public office there.

== Acquiring Nigerian nationality ==
Nationality can be obtained in Nigeria at birth or later in life through naturalisation.

=== By birth ===
Typically, in Nigeria, there are no provisions to acquire nationality through jus soli, i.e. by birth in the territory, which means that foundlings or orphans whose parents are unknown are stateless. Those who are eligible for nationality by birth include:

- Persons born anywhere whose parents are Nigerian nationals; or
- Persons born in Nigeria who have at least one grandparent who was Nigerian, or belonged to an indigenous community of Nigeria prior to independence.

=== By naturalisation ===
Naturalisation can be granted to persons who have resided in Nigeria for a sufficient period of time to confirm they understand the customs and traditions of the country and the responsibilities of citizenship. Applications are submitted to the Ministry of the Interior, who in turn forwards the paperwork to various state agencies like the Immigration Service, State Security Service, as well as the state governor, chair of the local governing body, and the police. If it is accepted, the application is then sent to the Federal Executive Council for a recommendation. The final decision on the application comes from the President of Nigeria. General qualifications are that applicants have good character and be able to contribute to the progress of the nation. Nigerian statutes have no provisions for adopted children to acquire nationality. Applicants must verify legal residency of a minimum of fifteen years. Besides foreigners meeting the criteria, the wife of a Nigerian national who meets the other criteria for naturalisation can register without a residency period.

== Loss of nationality ==
Nigerians are allowed to renounce their nationality, provided that comply with registration processes. The government may oppose during times of war. Nationals of origin cannot be deprived of their nationality. Naturalised persons can be denaturalised for working for another nation without governmental consent, or for committing serious crimes, disloyal acts, or crimes against the state or state security.

== Dual nationality ==
Nigeria allows dual nationality for most persons, but does not allow persons who have been naturalised in another country to naturalise as a Nigerian. Nationals of origin in Nigeria or another country are allowed to naturalise without renouncing other nationality. Members of the government — like the president, governor, or state and national legislators — are allowed to have dual nationality only if they acquired Nigerian citizenship by birth and have held this continuously.

== History ==
=== African people and European contact (1000–1861) ===
In the northern part of the area now known as Nigeria many ethnic groups resided, some of whom developed centralised governments. Among them were the Hausa, Idoma, Igala, Igbira, Jukun, Kanuri, Nupe, and Tiv peoples. The southern part of what is now Nigeria was dominated by the Edo, Igbo, and Yoruba peoples. The Kanem–Bornu Empire of the Kanuri arose in the eighth century and at its peak controlled territory extending across the modern nations of Chad, Nigeria and Libya. By the eleventh century, seven non-aligned Hausa Kingdoms had also been founded in the north. Hausa rulers lived in walled-cities and required inhabitants to pay taxes in exchange for protection from invaders. In the south, the Benin Empire of the Edo and the Oyo Empire of the Yoruba developed around the same time as the Hausa Kingdoms. The various communities were involved in the Trans-Saharan trade system, which was linked to the Muslim world through Arab and Berber traders.

In 1472, Portuguese traders visited the Benin Empire and Lagos and within a decade had established trade. Missionaries were sent to the Empire in 1515 and from 1482, Portuguese merchants began establishing trading posts around Lagos and on the banks of the Benin River. The Portuguese were followed by other Europeans interested in commercial ventures, like the British, Spaniards, Dutch, and French. All became engaged in the Transatlantic Slave Trade, purchasing slaves from the indigenous people. Most trade focused on the coasts. European involvement in coastal Africa led to increasing interest in the last half of the eighteenth century to explore the interiors of Africa. In 1807, Britain abolished the slave trade and became interested in developing other commodities that could be traded, as well as preventing other nations from continuing to trade in slaves. In 1822, Scottish explorer, Hugh Clapperton, set out on a four-year mission to explore the area. He encountered the Hausa people and reported on their trade networks.

In 1830, the course of the Lower Niger was traced. Anglican missionaries arrived in the area in 1841, Methodist missionaries began establishing missions around Badagry in 1842, and these were soon followed by Baptist missions. In 1849, Heinrich Barth, a German explorer from Hamburg, as part of an official British expedition led by James Richardson was sent to the region to explore the possibilities for trade. Barth trekked through the Kanem–Bornu Empire and reported that wars between the Bornu and Sokoto Empires had reduced the area into anarchy. He explored along the Middle Niger through 1855, reporting intact trade networks, but noted that internal strife and external attacks made the political structures vulnerable. As he made his way along the Upper Niger to Timbuktu, Barth noted that commerce networks were intact, but there was political unrest and uncertainty due largely to the aftermath of the Fula jihads. Britain purchased the Danish trading forts in West Africa in 1850 and the following year, established a diplomatic outpost at Lagos.

Throughout the 1850s, there was increasing competition between the British, French, and German nations to control West Africa. By 1857 Britain claimed to control the entire Gambia River, which implied the government's responsibility to protect the inhabitants of the region. In 1859, the British government clarified its position that foreign traders living in their colonies were afforded the same protections as British subjects, even when trading outside of its area of territorial control. Along the Niger, British policy was changing as well, from the idea of an informal empire toward colonial administration. In an attempt to provide a framework to develop and protect British trade, the British became involved in a dispute over succession in the Lagos royal family and similarly to check French influence and expansion from Dahomey, discussions began regarding establishment of a protectorate over Lagos. From 1860, war among the Yoruba states began impacting the growth of commerce from Lagos, prompting deeper consideration of establishing colonial control.

=== British period (1861–1960) ===
Britain annexed Lagos as the Lagos Colony in 1861 and over the next few years negotiated land cessions for Badagry, Lekki and Palma, in the Borno region to extend their control over most of the lagoons in the surrounding area. These actions heightened tensions with the French, particularly in the northern region. In 1864, the British founded a settlement at Lokoja with the intent of establishing commerce, but it failed in 1869. The loss of the trading center did not diminish interest in the area, and four trading firms – the West African Company, Central African Company, Williams Brothers, and James Pinnock were operating along the Niger by 1878. The following year, these were joined into the United African Company, which later became the National African Company. Continued expansion and signing of protection treaties with local leaders established British dominance by 1882 in Nigeria. In 1884 the Oil River Protectorate was established. Continuing conflicts during the 'Scramble for Africa', culminated in the 1884–1885 Berlin Conference in which the colonial powers designated portions of Africa into European spheres of influence. At the conference, Britain's claims of a de facto monopoly over the trade along the Niger, effectively allowed it to gain control over northern Nigeria.

Reluctant to bear the cost of administrating the territory, in 1886, the government reauthorised the National African Company, now called the Royal Niger Company, to manage the territory in exchange for a trade monopoly. In 1893 the Oil River Protectorate was renamed as the Niger Coast Protectorate. The Royal Niger Company charter was revoked in 1900 and the territories which it had administrated were combined to form the Northern Nigeria Protectorate. Territories to the south of this protectorate, including the Niger Coast Protectorate, were consolidated at the same time and named the Southern Nigeria Protectorate. In 1906, the Lagos Colony and the Southern Protectorate were combined into a single administrative unit and in 1914, the Northern protectorate was incorporated as well. The new name for Colonial Nigeria became the Colony and Protectorate of Nigeria at that time.

In Britain, allegiance, in which subjects pledged to support a monarch, was the precursor to the modern concept of nationality. The crown recognized from 1350 that all persons born within the territories of the British Empire were subjects. Those born outside the realm — except children of those serving in an official post abroad, children of the monarch, and children born on a British ship — were considered by common law to be foreigners. Marriage did not affect the status of a subject of the realm, but under common law, single women, including divorcées, were not allowed to be parents thus their children could not derive nationality maternally and were stateless unless legitimated by their father. British Nationality Acts did not extend beyond the bounds of the United Kingdom of Great Britain and Ireland, meaning that under Britain's rules of conquest, laws in place at the time of acquisition remained in place until changed. Other than common law, there was no standard statutory law which applied for subjects throughout the realm, meaning different jurisdictions created their own legislation for local conditions, which often conflicted with the laws in other jurisdictions in the empire. Thus, a person who was naturalised in Canada, for example, would be considered a foreigner, rather than a British national, in Australia or South Africa. In Nigeria, those who inhabited Lagos, were considered British subjects, while those who lived in the protectorates were granted the status of British Protected Persons (BPP).

==== Persons in the Nigeria Colony and British-born subjects living in the Protectorate of Nigeria (1914–1960) ====
In 1911, at the Imperial Conference a decision was made to draft a common nationality code for use across the empire. The British Nationality and Status of Aliens Act 1914 allowed local jurisdictions in the British self-governing territories to continue regulating nationality in their jurisdictions, but also established an imperial nationality scheme for use throughout the realm. Under its terms, common law provisions were reiterated for natural-born persons born within the realm on or after the effective date. By using the word person, the statute nullified legitimacy requirements for jus soli nationals, meaning an illegitimate child could derive nationality from its mother. For those born abroad on or after the effective date, legitimacy was still required, and nationality could only be derived by a child from a British father (one generation), who was natural-born or naturalised. It also provided that a married woman derived her nationality from her spouse, meaning if he was British, she was also, and if he was foreign, so was she. It stipulated that upon loss of nationality of a husband, a wife could declare that she wished to remain British. It allowed that if a marriage had terminated, through death or divorce, a British-born national who had lost her status through marriage could reacquire British nationality through naturalisation without meeting a residency requirement. The statute specified that a five-year residency or service to the crown was required for naturalisation.

Amendments to the British Nationality Act were enacted in 1918, 1922, 1933 and 1943 changing derivative nationality by descent and modifying slightly provisions for women to lose their nationality upon marriage. Because of a rise in statelessness, a woman who did not automatically acquire her husband's nationality upon marriage or upon his naturalisation in another country, did not lose their British status after 1933. The 1943 revision allowed a child born abroad at any time to be a British national by descent if the Secretary of State agreed to register the birth. Under the terms of the British Nationality Act 1948 British nationals in the Nigeria Colony were reclassified at that time as "Citizens of the UK and Colonies" (CUKC). The basic British nationality scheme did not change overmuch, and typically those who were previously defined as British remained the same. Changes included that wives and children no longer automatically acquired the status of the husband or father, children who acquired nationality by descent no longer were required to make a retention declaration, and registrations for children born abroad were extended.

==== Indigenous persons (British Protected Persons) in the Nigeria Protectorate (1914–1960) ====
British protectorates, in 1914, were considered to be foreign territories lacking an internal government. When Britain extended this status over a territory, it took responsibility for both internal and external administration, including defense and foreign relations. Indigenous persons who were born in a protectorate were known as British Protected Persons and were not entitled to be British nationals. BPPs had no right of return to the United Kingdom and were unable to exercise rights of citizenship; however, they could be issued a passport and could access diplomatic services when traveling abroad. In 1914, the Alien Restriction Act clarified that while BPPs were not nationals, neither were they aliens. When the law was amended in 1919, that provision remained the same, meaning that BPPs could not naturalise. Until 1934, when the British Protected Persons Order was drafted, the status of BPP was not statutory, but rather granted at the prerogative of the monarch. Under the 1934 Order, Belonger status with regard to protected territories was defined to mean persons born before or after the Order in a protectorate who possessed no nationality and were not a British subject, or persons born abroad to a native of a protectorate who were stateless and not British subjects. The statute extended BPP status to children and wives of BPPs, if they were stateless, and specifically provided that if a woman married someone who was a national of another nation, she lost her BPP status.

In 1943, the British Nationality Act clarified that BPPs born abroad in territories that were within the Crown's dominions were British subjects by virtue of jus soli, but those born within a protectorate were not subjects. Under the terms of the British Nationality Act 1948, BPPs of the Nigeria Protectorate status did not change. However, the Act, while retaining the provisions that BPPs were not aliens and could not naturalise, allowed BPPs to register as BPP of a protected place or as a British subject under certain conditions. In 1949, the British Protectorates, Protected States and Protected Persons Order in Council repealed former orders about BPPs and detailed provisions for conferring protected status. It provided that protected persons were BPPs of a protectorate if they were born there; if they were born abroad to a father who was a native of a protectorate; or if at the time of their birth their father was a BPP. It also allowed women married to BPPs to register as a BPP and allowed certain nationals of foreign countries to register as BPPs. Minor changes to protected persons' status were made by Orders of Council in 1952, 1953, 1958, 1960, 1961, and 1962, but major changes did not occur until 1965.

=== Post-independence (1960–present) ===
Nigeria gained its independence on 1 October 1960, meaning that those who acquired Nigerian nationality on that date, ceased to be British. On that day, under the terms of the Independence Constitution, persons who had been born in either the colony or protectorate to a parent or grandparent who was also born in the colony or protectorate were conferred Nigerian nationality. It was also conferred on persons who had been born outside of Nigeria if their father had been born in either the colony or protectorate and was at independence a CUKC or BPP, or at his death if he died prior to independence. Persons who had been naturalised, persons born in the territory to parents who were not born there, and women who had acquired nationality through marriage to a Nigerian prior to independence did not lose their status as a CUKC or BPP. While they were not conferred Nigerian nationality, they were provided an opportunity to register as Nigerian until 1 October 1962. After independence, those who were born after independence could acquire nationality through birth in the country, as long as their parent(s) did not have diplomatic immunity and their father was not an enemy alien, or if born abroad, as long as their father was Nigerian and born in the territory. Those who did not qualify for acquisition by birth, could apply for naturalisation. Dual nationality was forbidden except in the case of a child who had double status from birth. Upon attaining legal majority, and prior to the age of twenty-two, such a child was required to renounce their other nationality or cease to be Nigerian

Subsequently the Citizenship Act of 1960 was passed specifying criteria and procedures for acquiring nationality through naturalisation and registration. Under a plebiscite held on 11 February 1961, the inhabitants of southern British Cameroon, voted to join an independent French Cameroon by a margin of 7 to 3. The inhabitants of the northern part of British Cameroon voted to become part of Nigeria on 1 June 1961. By the Northern Cameroons Administration Amendment Order of Council 1961/988 and an amendment Act (Law 24) to the Nigerian Constitution, Northern Cameroon was incorporated into the Federal Republic of Nigeria. Under the terms of the constitutional amendment, persons who were CUKCs or BPPs born in Northern Cameroon or the wife of a person meeting the criteria effectively became Nigerian nationals. (Note: The native inhabitants of southern British Cameroon remained BPPs under the United Nations trust agreement until 1 October 1961. As the British trusteeship was a single territory, those inhabitants of the northern British Cameroons became Nigerian in June, but did not cease to be BPPs until 1 October when the trusteeship ceased to exist.) In 1963, the constitution was changed to create the Nigerian republic, but no significant changes were made to the regulations for nationality.

In 1974, the military government which had ruled Nigeria since a 1966 coup d'état repealed the Citizenship Act and constitutional provisions related to the automatic acquisition of nationality. Acquisition at birth was changed to automatic granting of nationality only if a child was born in the country to at least one parent was born or naturalised/registered in Nigeria, or if a child was born abroad and both parents were Nigerian nationals. (Note: The 1974 constitution, according to Bronwen Manby, a scholar on African nationality laws, did not contain language preserving the status of those who had previously acquired Nigerian nationality and it was unclear if the new provision was supposed to be retroactive. Manby also notes that after the repeal of the Citizenship Act, in 1974, it was never replaced.) Military rule ended and a new civilian regime was elected in 1979. Under the 1979 Constitution, which created a presidential government based on the United States model, nationality was acquired by descent from someone who was part of an indigenous community of Nigeria; however, it did not clearly define what communities were considered indigenous or how indigeneity was determined. It provided that those born in the territory prior to independence were Nigerian, if one of their parents or grandparents had also been born in Nigeria. Those born in Nigeria after independence automatically acquired nationality by descent from a parent or grandparent who was a Nigerian national and those born abroad automatically acquired nationality by descent from a Nigerian parent. The 1979 Constitution also specified that those who had formerly obtained nationality under previous legislation remained Nigerian.

In 1999, a new constitution was adopted after a second military regime ended. The nationality scheme did not change other than to allow dual nationality only for Nigerians of origin. Human rights monitoring organisations of international agreements like the 1999 African Charter on the Rights and Welfare of the Child and United Nations Convention on the Reduction of Statelessness, 1961 have noted that the 1999 Constitution makes no provision for foundings or orphans with unknown parentage discovered in Nigeria or adoptees to acquire nationality. Though Nigeria passed the Child Rights Act in 2003, which guarantees adopted children the same legal rights as a biological child, the statute makes no mention of nationality. Universal Periodic Reviews have also noted that the 1999 Constitution retains gender discrimination which is prohibited under the Convention on the Elimination of All Forms of Discrimination Against Women in that while foreign wives can acquire Nigerian nationality by registration upon marriage, foreign husbands can only acquire nationality through naturalisation.
