= Kenyan passport =

Passport of the Republic of Kenya issued to Kenyan citizens

Kenyan E-passport
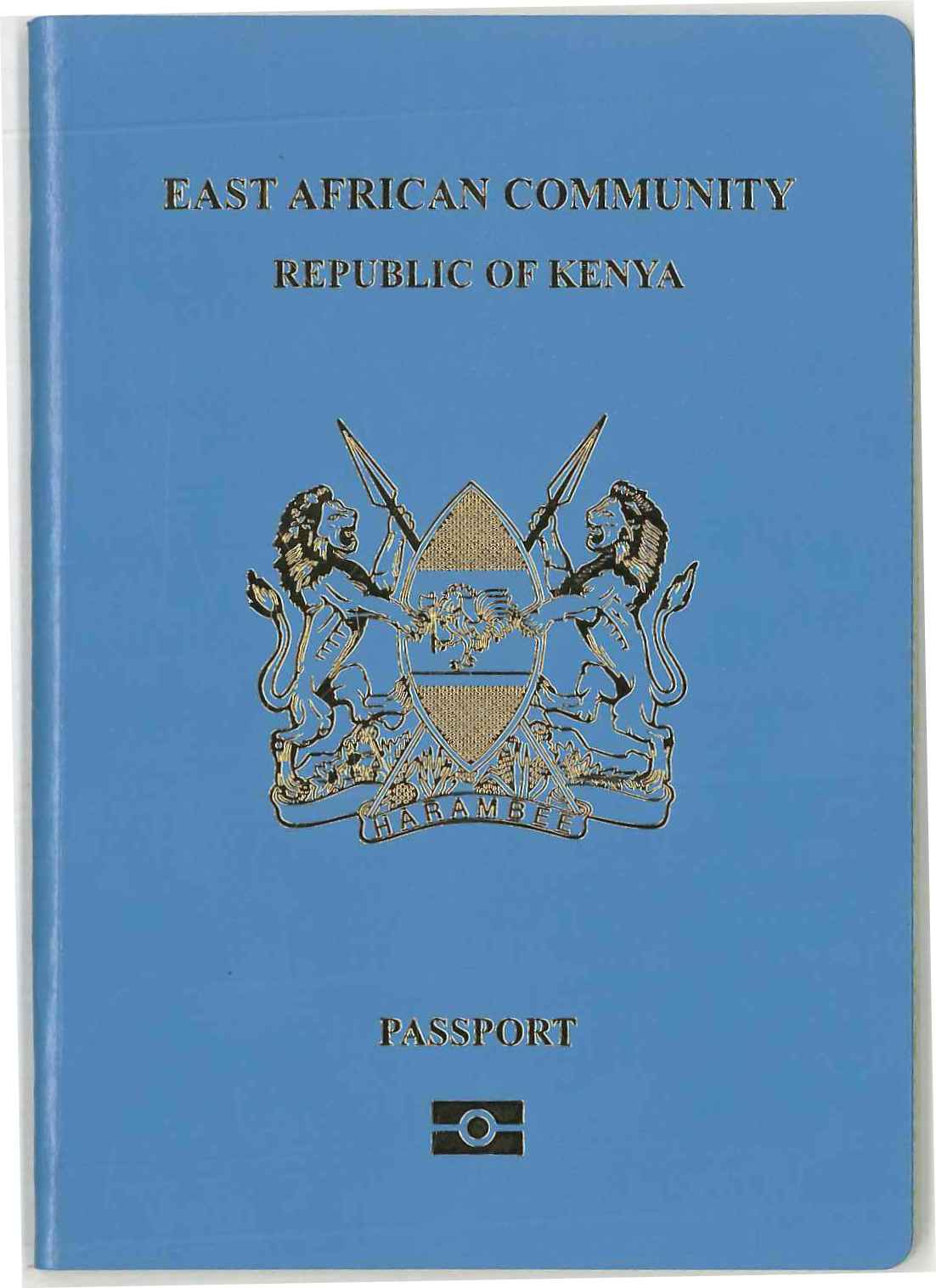
- Front cover of the current Kenyan E-passport (with chip), issued since September 2017
- Type: Passport
- Issued by: Directorate of Immigration and Registration of Persons.
- First issued: 1 September 2017 (current version)
- Purpose: Identification
- Valid in: All countries
- Eligibility: Kenyan citizenship
- Expiration: 10 years
- Cost: 34 Pages Ordinary "A" Series Kshs. 4550. 50 pages Ordinary "B" Series Kshs. 6050. 66 Pages Ordinary "C" Series kshs.7550. East African passport ksh.990. Mutilated Passport Kshs 10,050. Lost Passport Kshs 12,050.

The Kenyan passport is issued to Kenyan citizens in accordance with the Constitution of Kenya, 2010 and as provided for in the Kenya Citizens and Immigration Act that commenced on 30 August 2011. In addition issuance process is regulated by Legal Notice No. 64 (the Kenya Citizenship and Immigration Regulations, 2012). If eligible, an individual can apply for a New Passport, Renewal Passport and Replacement Passport. Passports are issued by the Department of Immigration. The department is under the Ministry of Interior and Coordination of National Government. Kenyan passports are usually used as a form of ID as well and would be rated as second to the Kenyan national ID card. Before Kenya got independence from Britain, British passports were used.

== Bio-metric passport ==
Since September 2017, Kenya issues the new East African format ePassport. Directorate of Immigration and Registration of Persons, Gordon Kihalangwa, said on a live Twitter chat that tracking individuals’ movements will become easier with the ePassport. This is inline with digitization of Kenya. The new bio-metric passport contains the holders bio-data such as finger prints, digitally stored photo and signature among others.

Features of the Kenyan Bio-metric passport

- Electronic chip holding the same information as the old model passport
- Bio-metric identifier
- Digital photograph of the passport holder
- Security features to prevent unauthorized use and forgery
- Details of the ePassport will be registered with the International Civil Aviation Organization (ICAO).

The new color adopted on the Kenyan ordinary passport, light blue, is the official color of the East African Community. The old ordinary passport was phased out by 31 August 2019 (extended to 1 March 2021) and rendered unusable and cease to being recognized as travel documents. Holders of existing old format passports were strongly advised to apply for the new ePassport before this date.

== Validity ==
According to the department of immigration under Ministry of Interior and National Coordination, and read together with the Kenyan constitution, Kenyan passports are valid for ten years after date of issuance. Children and persons under eighteen years are required to have their own government issued passport separate from the parent. Minors application is done on the parents e-citizen account. Fees are the same as for adults and validity is also ten years.

== Valid jurisdictions ==
The Kenyan passport is valid in all Commonwealth countries and all foreign nations of the world.

== Caution ==
The passport remains the property of the government of Kenya and may be withdrawn at any time.

== See also ==
- List of passports
- Visa requirements for Kenyan citizens

== Notes ==
- East African Community Passports are issued and replaced by the competent authorities in East African partner States or the Diplomatic Mission abroad.
- This passport is valid for 10 years from the date of issue unless otherwise stated. If at any time a passport contains no further space for visas or in the case of significant changes in the facial appearance owing to age, medical condition, or any other reason a new passport must e obtained.
- The possession of a passport does not exempt the holder from compliance with any immigration regulations or formalities in force in the foreign countries or from the necessity of obtaining a visa or permit where required(noted on page 32, 33,34 in English, Swahili and French respectively).

== Languages ==
Kenya has two official languages, English and Swahili, and in all government and legal documents both languages are used.

In the Kenyan passport, French is also used.

== Types of passports ==
There are three types of passports:

- Diplomatic (maroon cover): Issuable to Kenyan diplomats accredited overseas and their eligible dependents and to citizens who reside in the foreign country.

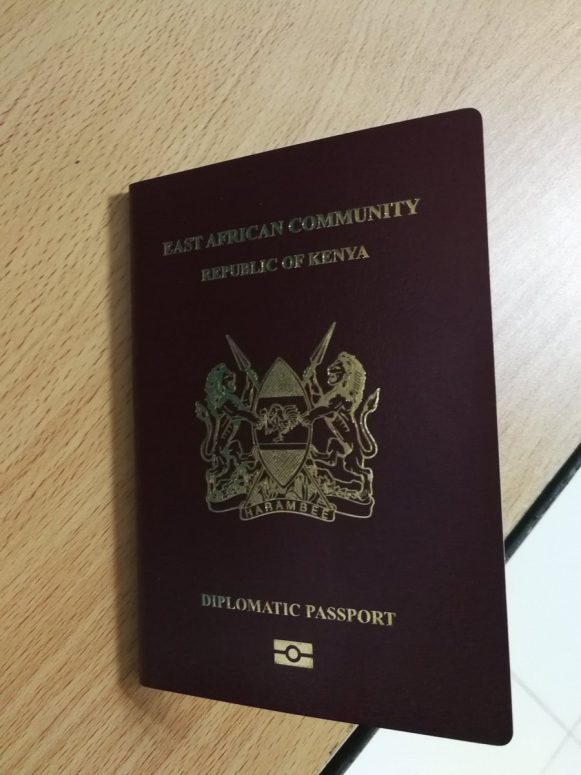
Kenyan Diplomatic E-passport

- Ordinary (light blue cover): Issuable to Kenyan citizens while traveling abroad, valid for 10 years

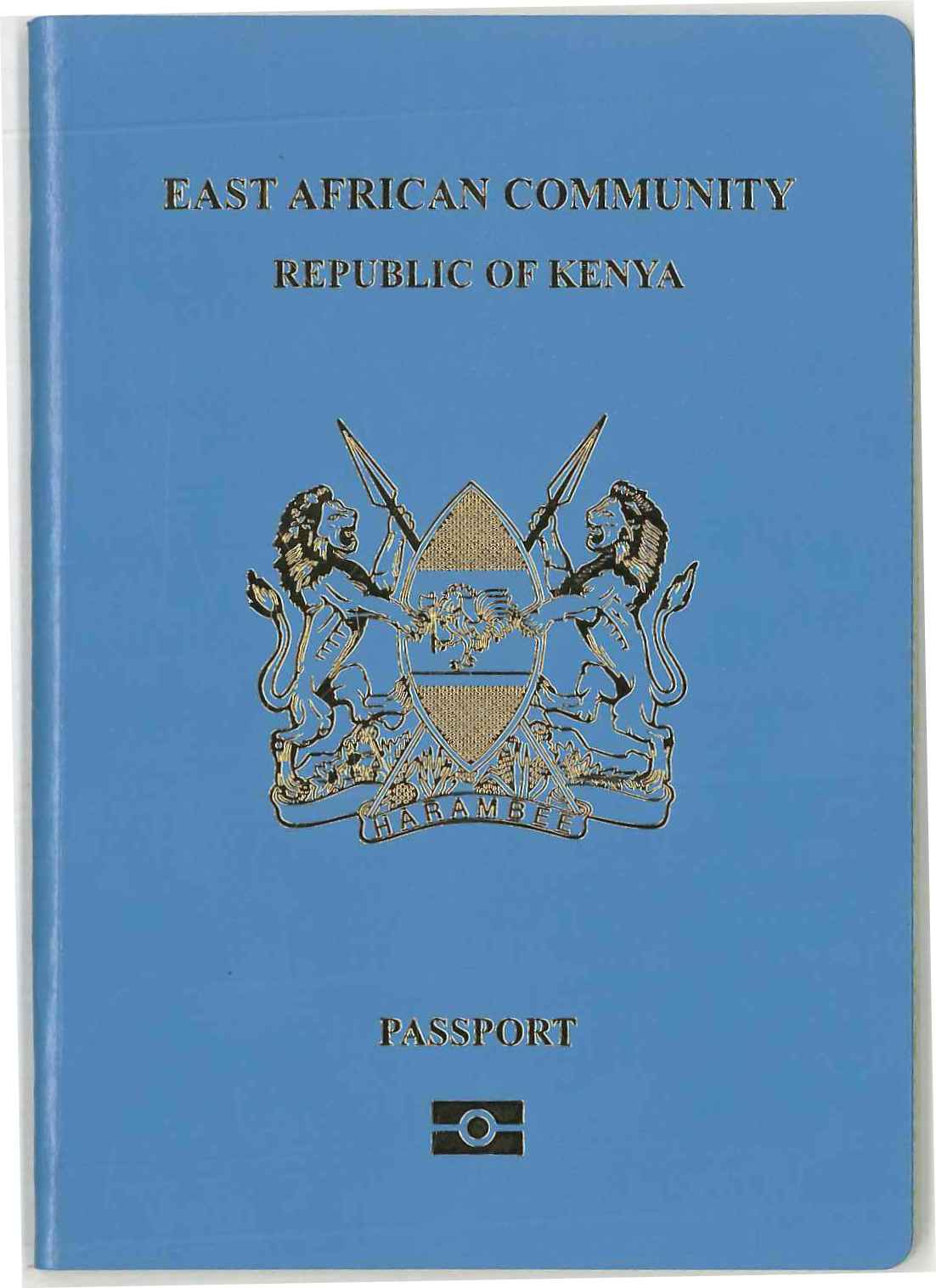
Kenyan E-passport

- East African passport (light blue cover): Issuable to Kenyans for travel within the East African Community, valid for six months and usable for multiple entry into: Tanzania, Uganda, Rwanda, and Burundi.

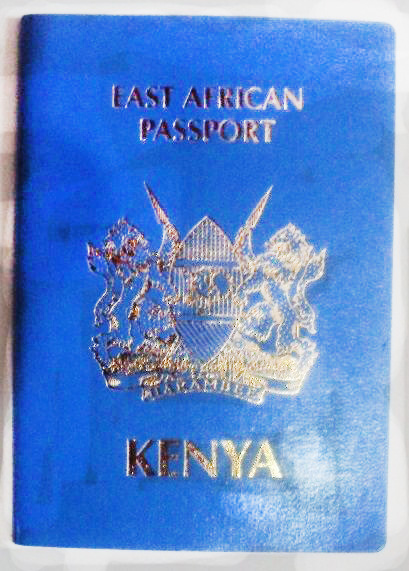
East African passport only for Tanzania, Uganda, Rwanda and Burundi

== Appearance ==
Kenyan passports have the Kenyan coat of arms emblazoned in gold in the center of the front cover. The words "EAST AFRICAN COMMUNITY" are inscribed at the top followed by "REPUBLIC OF KENYA" is inscribed in gold text above the coat of arms, while "PASSPORT" is inscribed in gold text below it. The back cover is left blank.

The passport note occupies the second page of the passport, and the emergency contact information is on the last page. The identity information page is printed on the inside of the passport's second page, while the person's description are on the third page.

The pages of Kenyan passports are watermarked with the Kenyan coat of arms. The pages feature designs with the 'big five game' animals commonly found in Kenyan national parks and reserves: the lion, elephant, leopard, rhino and buffalo.

The inside front cover of the passport shows the East African logo with the word "Passport No." in English, Swahili and French; and in bold letters and numbers the passport number. The second page shows the words "East African Community" and "Republic of Kenya" in bold, uppercase letters.

Then the notes read first in English:

These are to request and require in the Name of the President of the Republic of Kenya all those whom it may concern to allow the bearer of this pass freely without let or hindrance and to afford the bearer such assistance and protection as may be necessary.

And in Swahili:

Hii ni kuwaomba na kuwasihi, kwa jina la Rais wa Jamhuri ya Kenya, wote wanohusika, kwa kusudi la kumruhusu mwenye pasi hii kupita bila kizuizi ama kipingamzi chochote na vile vile kumpa msaada na ulinzi wowote ambao utakaoonekana kuwa wa lazima.

then in French:

Au nom de Son Excellence Monsieur le President de la République de Kenya, nous vous de bien vouloir laisser librement circuler le titulaire de ce passeport et lui prêter main forte et protection en cas de nécessité.

== Identity information page ==
The second page of the Kenyan passport has the following:

- The words "Republic of Kenya" written in English, Swahili and French.
- E-passport Logo
- Photo of passport owner
- Watermark feature showing the map of Kenya
- Type of document (P=Passport)
- Code of issuing country (K=Kenya)
- Passport number — mixture of letters and numbers
- Reference number also known as file number
- Surname
- Given names
- Sex
- Date of issue
- Date of expiry
- Nationality
- Place of birth
- Authority that issued passport
- Holder's signature

The page ends with a two line machine readable zone, according to ICAO standard 9303. Also the holder's National ID card number.

There is also a holographic 3D copy of the owners picture, holographic copy of the two machine readable lines, security features seen under special UV light, holographic micro printing and kinematic elements.

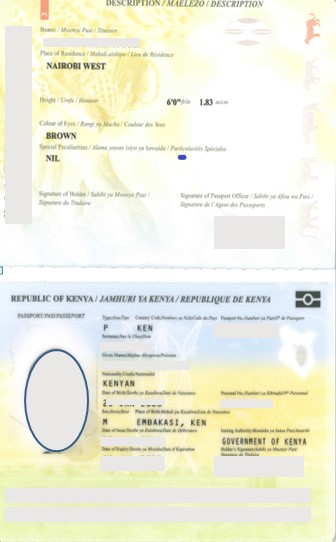
Biometric and description page of the East African Community Kenyan passport

== RFID chip and bio-metric certificate ==
Since 1 September 2017, Kenyan passports have had a contact-less smart card (proximity card) chip and 13.56 MHz loop antenna embedded in the front cover page, in accordance with ICAO standards. The chip and antenna and are not visually recognized, but their presence is indicated by ICAO bio-metric passport symbol at the bottom. It carries all the bio-metric data printed on the passport, JPEG file photo, digitally protected by a signature. Also an alphanumeric pseudorandomly assigned high-entropy serial number which is 45 bits. This improves the crypto-graphic strength of the basic access control (BAC) mechanism of the RFID chip.

== Dual citizenship ==
According to the Kenyan constitution, a person can be a Kenyan citizen by birth or by registration. The new constitution of 2010, unlike the previous one, allows a Kenyan citizen who acquires another country's citizenship after 27 August 2010, to have dual citizenship. He/she is required by law to immediately declare his status by completing:

- Two sets of dully filled Form-2-declaration of dual citizenship and attach the following documents:
- Two copies of proof of previous Kenyan citizenship (copy of passport, birth certificate, Kenyan National ID card).
- Two copies of proof of the other country's citizenship.

== Regaining citizenship ==
Persons who lost their Kenyan citizenship before 27 August 2010 are entitled to regain after filling:

- Two copies of Form 5 "regain citizenship form" and attach the following.
- Two copies of either: Kenyan passport, Kenyan national ID card or birth certificate.
- Two copies of proof of the other country of citizenship.

== Visa requirements ==
As of 9 October 2023, Kenyan citizens had visa-free or visa on arrival access to 73 countries and territories, ranking the Kenyan passport 74th in terms of travel freedom according to the Henley Passport Index.

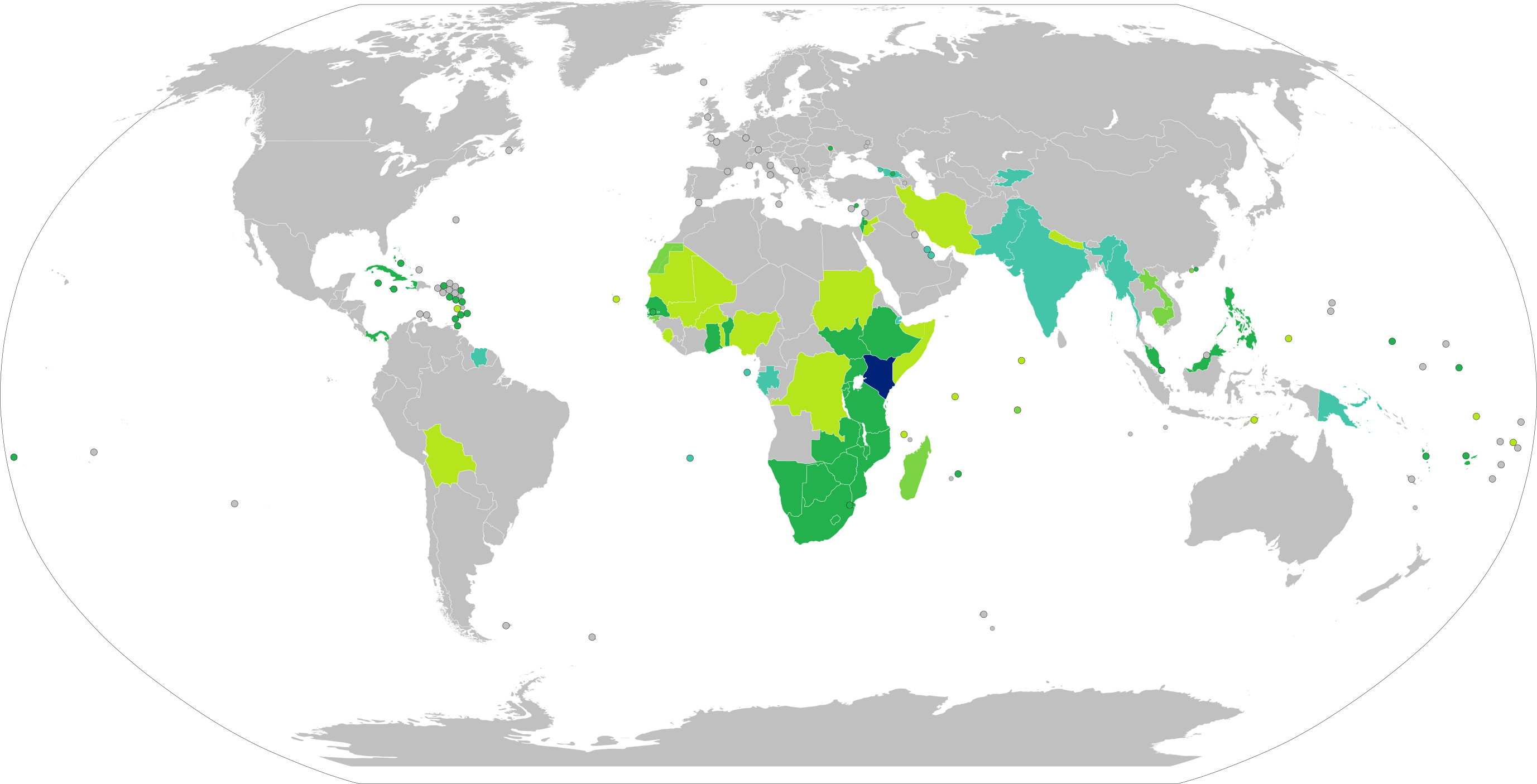
Countries and territories with visa-free or visa on arrival entry for holders of regular Kenyan passports
