= Ugandan passport =

Passport issued to citizens of Uganda

Republic of Uganda Passport
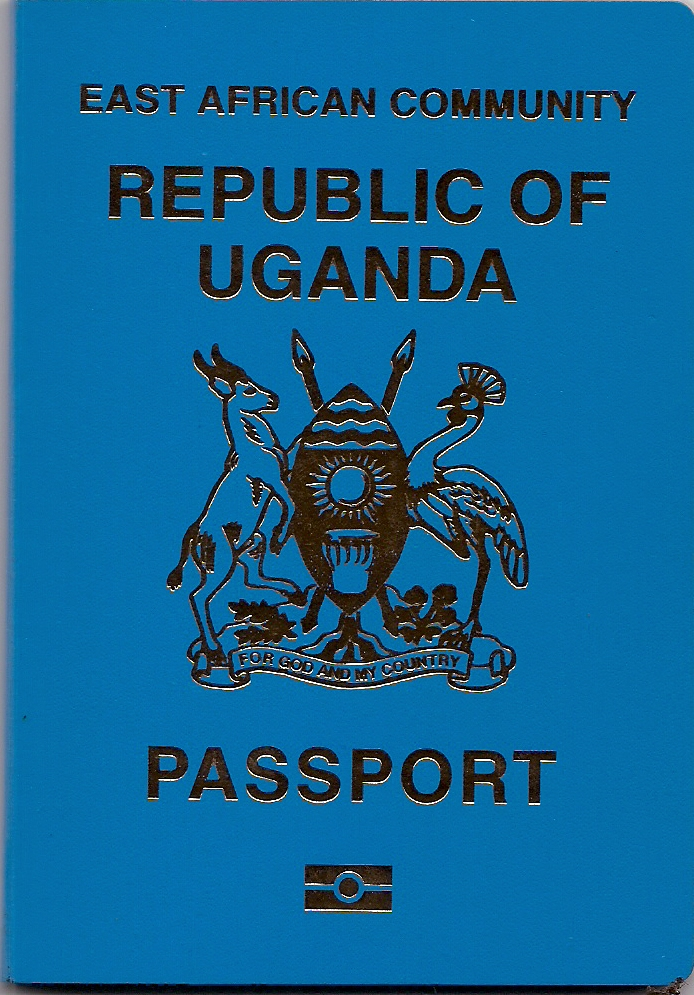
- Uganda biometric passport
- Type: Passport
- Issued by: Directorate of Citizenship and Immigration Control
- Eligibility: Ugandan citizenship
- Expiration: 10 years after issuance
- Cost: UGX 250,000/= for ordinary passports UGX 400,000 service and official passports UGX 500,000 for diplomatic Passports.

The Ugandan passport is a document issued to citizens of Uganda for international travel.

== History ==
Passports with the name Uganda written upon them or used by Ugandan citizens were first used in the 1940s although they were mainly used by Asians and Afro-British nationals. The passport was a British titled passport but in the location it mentioned Uganda. At this time Uganda was still a British Protectorate but unlike Kenya it was slightly more self-governing. Uganda became an independent Dominion on 9 October 1962, then a republic on 9 October 1963 and it is from that day that all the passports have the title of Republic of Uganda Passports. But since 1986 the current terms of the passport haven't changed hence enabling any Ugandan citizen travel freely to any country of their choosing.

== Issuance ==
Under the Uganda Citizenship and Immigration Control Act 2009, Ugandan passports and other travel documents may only be issued to and held individuals that are proven to be citizens of Uganda . This is overseen by a passport control officer and a deputy passport control officer

They are processed and issued only by Government of Uganda through the Directorate of Immigration Control (DCIC). The Uganda Citizenship and Immigration Control Act 2009 also provides for the issue or renewal of the passport and other travel documents at Uganda diplomatic missions abroad and these currently are in : Washington DC (United States of America), London (United Kingdom) and Pretoria (Republic of South Africa).

== Visa requirements ==
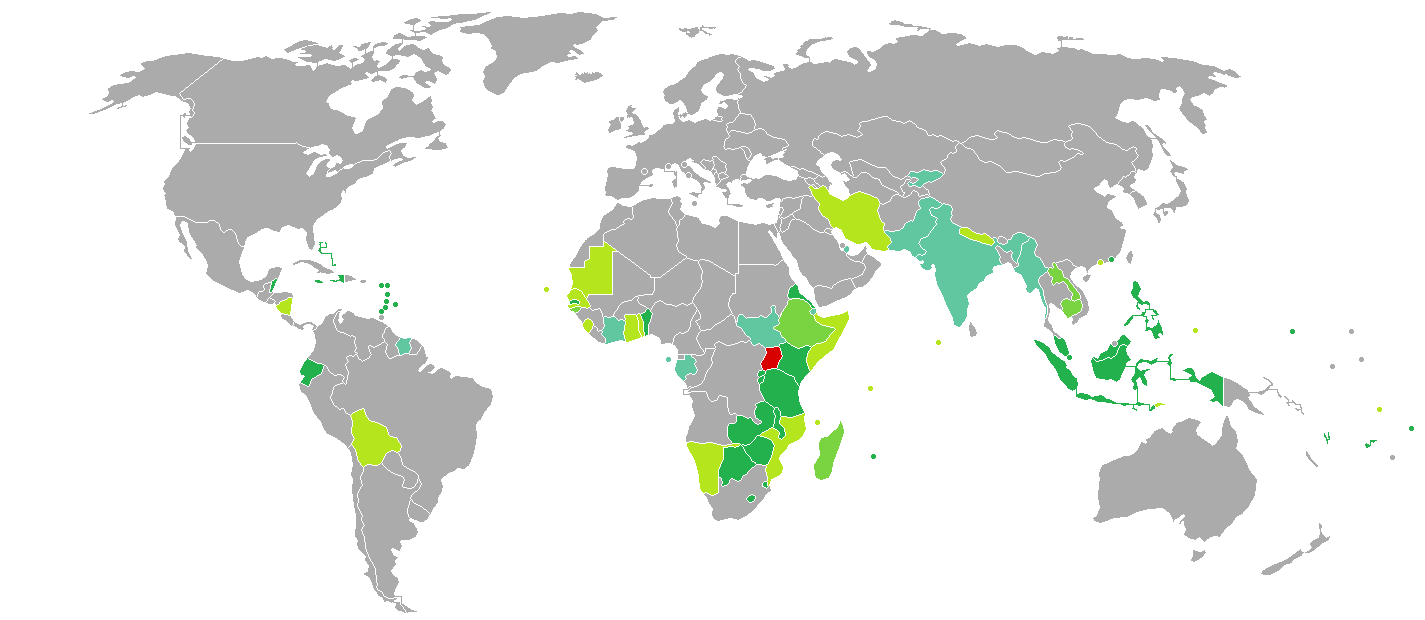
Visa requirements for Ugandan citizens Uganda Visa-free Visa on arrival eVisa Visa required

As of 1 January 2017, Ugandan citizens had visa-free or visa on arrival access to 61 countries and territories, ranking the Ugandan passport 75th in terms of travel freedom (tied with Filipino passport) according to the Henley visa restrictions index.

== Validity ==
The Passports Act 1982 set the validity of the Ugandan passport at 5 years. This has since been increased to 10 years under a provision of

== Withdrawal ==
Part V, Section 47, Sub Section 1 of The Uganda Citizenship and Immigration Control Act 2009 sets out the conditions under which a Ugandan passport can be temporarily withdrawn or seized from the holder

- where the holder is lawfully charged with a felony;
- where the holder is a habitual criminal;
- where the holder is deported or repatriated to Uganda and the conditions or reasons for his or her deportation or repatriation are still standing; and
- subject to the Constitution, any other circumstance which, in the opinion of the board, would be prejudicial to the interests of the State or of the holder of the passport.

== Current ==
The Government of Uganda introduced new e-passports as of January 2019. The new e-Passports are presented in the following colours: Slay Blue (Ordinary Passport), Green (Service Passport) and Red (Diplomatic Passport).

== Other travel documents ==
- Temporary Movement Permit
- Certificate of Identity
- List of passports
- Visa requirements for Ugandan citizens
- Visa policy of Uganda
