= Ugandan nationality law =

Uganda Citizenship and Immigration Control Act

Parliament of Uganda
- Enacted by: Government of Uganda
- Status: Current legislation

Ugandan nationality law is regulated by the Constitution of Uganda, as amended; the Uganda Citizenship and Immigration Control Act; and various international agreements to which the country is a signatory. These laws determine who is, or is eligible to be, a national of Uganda. The legal means to acquire nationality, formal legal membership in a nation, differ from the domestic relationship of rights and obligations between a national and the nation, known as citizenship. Nationality describes the relationship of an individual to the state under international law, whereas citizenship is the domestic relationship of an individual within the nation. Commonwealth countries often use the terms nationality and citizenship as synonyms, despite their legal distinction and the fact that they are regulated by different governmental administrative bodies. Ugandan nationality is typically obtained under the principal of jus sanguinis, i.e. by birth to parents with Ugandan nationality. It can be granted to persons with an affiliation to the country, or to a permanent resident who has lived in the country for a given period of time through naturalisation or registration.

== Acquiring Ugandan nationality ==
Nationality can be obtained in Uganda at birth or later in life through naturalisation or registration.

=== By birth ===
Typically, in Uganda, provisions to acquire nationality through jus soli, i.e. by birth in the territory, require that a person have ancestry with a particular racial or ethnic background. Those who are eligible for nationality by birth include:

- Persons born anywhere who have at least one parent or grandparent who was a national of Uganda by birth;
- Persons born in Uganda who belong to one of the sixty-five indigenous communities defined in the constitution of Uganda by virtue of having a parent or grandparent who lived in the territory on 1 February 1926; or (Note: Per the constitution, the indigenous communities include: Acholi; Aliba; Alur; Aringa; Baamba; Babukusu; Babwisi; Bafumbira; Baganda; Bagisu; Bagungu; Bagwe; Bagwere; Bahehe; Bahororo; Bakenyi; Bakiga; Bakonzo; Banyabindi; Banyabutumbi; Banyankore; Banyara; Banyaruguru; Banyarwanda; Banyole; Banyoro; Baruli; Barundi;Basamia; Basoga; Basongora; Batagwenda; Batoro; Batuku; Batwa; Chope; Dodoth; Ethur; Gimara; Ik (Teuso); Iteso; Jie; Jonam; Jopadhola; Kakwa; Karimojong; Kebu (Okebu); Kuku; Kumam; Langi; Lendu; Lugbara; Madi; Mening; Mvuba; Napore; Ngikutio; Nubi; Nyangia; Pokot; Reli; Sabiny; Shana; So (Tepeth); and Vonoma.)
- Foundlings or orphans under the age of five whose parents are unknown. (Note: Bronwen Manby, an expert of African nationality laws, states in a 2016 report that the child's age must be under nine years old; but in a 2018 analysis shows five years. Both Tigranna Zakaryan, who compiled a report on nationality in Uganda in 2019 for the European University Institute, and the Uganda Citizenship Immigration Control Act of 1995, confirm the child must be five years old or less.)

=== By naturalisation or registration ===
Naturalisation can be granted to persons who have resided in Uganda for a sufficient period of time to confirm they understand the English or another language of Uganda, the customs and traditions of the country and the responsibilities of citizenship. General qualifications are that applicants have good character and can verify legal residency of a minimum of ten years. Persons whose parents or grandparents had diplomatic immunity, were refugees, or who have not continuously resided in Uganda since 9 October 1962, are ineligible to acquire Ugandan nationality by registration. Minor children may not be included in a naturalisation petition of their parent. Besides foreigners meeting the criteria, those who can naturalise or register include:

- Adoptees under the age of eighteen may acquire Ugandan nationality by registration, upon completion of the legal adoption process;
- The spouse of a Ugandan national may register as Ugandan after the marriage has endured for at least five years; or (Note: In her 2019 report Tigranna Zakaryan, states that the duration of marriage is required to be three years; however, both Bronwen Manby and the Uganda Citizenship Immigration Control Act of 1995, confirm the requirement is a minimum of five years.)
- Persons who have voluntarily migrated and resided in the country for twenty years may register as nationals.

== Loss of nationality ==
Ugandans are allowed to renounce their nationality, provided that they comply with registration processes and prove that they have obtained other nationality. Furthermore, Ugandan citizenship is lost if another citizenship is obtained, without having applied for dual citizenship. Before 2005, it was generally lost upon obtaining another citizenship. The government may oppose during times of war or if there is a conflict with public policy. Nationals of origin cannot be deprived of their nationality. Naturalised or registered persons can be denaturalised for working for another nation or military without governmental consent; for committing serious crimes, disloyal acts, or crimes against the state or state security; or for committing fraud, misrepresentation, or concealment in a naturalisation or registration application. Persons who were Ugandan by birth have previously lost their nationality may apply for repatriation, if restoring their nationality would not be contrary to public order and security. According to the Ugandan embassy in Berlin, children born to Ugandan parents abroad are not entitled to Ugandan citizenship if they are also citizens of their country of residence.

== Dual nationality ==
Since 2005, Uganda has allowed dual nationality for most persons, though persons wishing to naturalize must comply with a complex series of conditions. Holding more than two nationalities is not permitted and persons must prove that their other nationality does not restrict dual nationality. Members of the government — such as the president or vice president, prime minister or cabinet ministers, or heads of security services — may not have dual nationality.

== Commonwealth citizenship ==
Uganda joined the Commonwealth of Nations on 9 October 1962 and at that time, Ugandans gained the status of Commonwealth citizens.

== History ==
=== African people and European contact (1200–1894) ===
Archaeological evidence shows that pastoralist Nilo-Saharan speakers dominated the dry northern regions of the territory. From the first millennium BC, Bantu-speaking immigrants began to arrive from the east settling in the southern savanna of the Great Lakes region. By the second century, kingdoms emerged in the region which were organized under a system of patronage, wherein protection was offered in exchange for services. People who inhabited the northern region, like the Acholi, developed kinship and clan chiefdoms, but did not typically centralise their governance into large political kingdoms. Around 1200, the Empire of Kitara came to dominate the Great Lakes region and was succeeded by the Bunyoro Kingdom (also known as the Bunyoro-Kitara Kingdom) in the fourteenth century. As Bunyoro reached its peak and began its long decline in the sixteenth century, the Kingdom of Buganda was established. Bunyaro stretched across the south and southwest of the territory that is now Uganda and required tributes from smaller kingdoms like Ankole and Tooro. Buganda was centered at the northwest corner of Lake Victoria. These two kingdoms were the most powerful Bantu Kingdoms when Europeans arrived in the mid-nineteenth century.

Little contact with outsiders occurred before the nineteenth century, though trade emerged with Egypt, Sudan, and Zanzibar between 1823 and 1850. British explorer John Hanning Speke visited the area in 1862, followed by Samuel Baker who reached Lake Albert in 1864 and Henry Morton Stanley, who came in contact with the Buganda Kingdom in 1875. Soon after Stanley's visit, missionaries began to arrive in the territory, followed by European traders. By 1882, Britain and Germany had competing claims in the region. Britain, became increasingly protective of the area in large measure because of Egyptian interest after it had occupied Egypt under the guise of protecting the Suez Canal. Germany, was attempting to consolidate its rule over the territory between Lake Victoria, and Lake Malawi and west toward Lake Tanganyika. In 1890, under the terms of the Heligoland–Zanzibar Treaty, Britain acquired control of Uganda in exchange for German control of territories in present-day Burundi, Rwanda, and Tanzania.

=== British protectorate (1894–1962) ===
At the end of 1890, the British East Africa Company signed a protection agreement with Buganda for their help in a dispute with Bunyoro. In exchange for protection, Buganda agreed not to make trade agreements with other countries. Using Buganda as the center of their operations, Britain began to expand to other kingdoms, extending their rule to Ankole, Busoga, Kigezi, Kisoro and other kingdoms and chiefdoms. In 1893, the crown took over the territories from the East Africa Company and the following year formally declared its authority over the protectorates. In 1902, the territories were combined into the single Uganda Protectorate and from 1914 the modern boundaries of Uganda were settled except for the transfer of Rudolph Province to the jurisdiction of Kenya in 1926. Armed force was used between 1897 and 1933 against Bunyoro, when it was finally subdued and incorporated into the protectorate. During the period of colonial rule, large numbers of Asian indentured workers were brought from India and Pakistan to work in agriculture, as were Banyarwanda people from Ruanda-Urundi. Other Asians who lived in the British Empire migrated voluntarily to participate in economic activities.

In Britain, allegiance, in which subjects pledged to support a monarch, was the precursor to the modern concept of nationality. The crown recognized from 1350 that all persons born within the territories of the British Empire were subjects. Those born outside the realm — except children of those serving in an official post abroad, children of the monarch, and children born on a British ship — were considered by common law to be foreigners. Marriage did not affect the status of a subject of the realm, but under common law, single women, including divorcées, were not allowed to be parents thus their children could not derive nationality maternally and were stateless unless legitimated by their father. British Nationality Acts did not extend beyond the bounds of the United Kingdom of Great Britain and Ireland, meaning that under Britain's rules of conquest, laws in place at the time of acquisition remained in place until changed. Other than common law, there was no standard statutory law which applied for subjects throughout the realm, meaning different jurisdictions created their own legislation for local conditions, which often conflicted with the laws in other jurisdictions in the empire. Thus, a person who was naturalised in Canada, for example, would be considered a foreigner, rather than a British national, in Australia or South Africa. When British protectorates were established in 1815, there was little difference between the rights of British subjects and protected persons.

==== British subjects living in the Uganda Protectorate (1914–1960) ====
In 1911, at the Imperial Conference a decision was made to draft a common nationality code for use across the empire. The British Nationality and Status of Aliens Act 1914 allowed local jurisdictions in the British self-governing territories to continue regulating nationality in their jurisdictions, but also established an imperial nationality scheme for use throughout the realm. Under its terms, common law provisions were reiterated for natural-born persons born within the realm on or after the effective date. By using the word person, the statute nullified legitimacy requirements for jus soli nationals, meaning an illegitimate child could derive nationality from its mother. For those born abroad on or after the effective date, legitimacy was still required, and nationality could only be derived by a child from a British father (one generation), who was natural-born or naturalised. It also provided that a married woman derived her nationality from her spouse, meaning if he was British, she was also, and if he was foreign, so was she. It stipulated that upon loss of nationality of a husband, a wife could declare that she wished to remain British. It allowed that if a marriage had terminated, through death or divorce, a British-born national who had lost her status through marriage could reacquire British nationality through naturalisation without meeting a residency requirement. The statute specified that a five-year residency or service to the crown was required for naturalisation.

Amendments to the British Nationality Act were enacted in 1918, 1922, 1933 and 1943 changing derivative nationality by descent and modifying slightly provisions for women to lose their nationality upon marriage. Because of a rise in statelessness, a woman who did not automatically acquire her husband's nationality upon marriage or upon his naturalisation in another country, did not lose their British status after 1933. The 1943 revision allowed a child born abroad at any time to be a British national by descent if the Secretary of State agreed to register the birth. Under the terms of the British Nationality Act 1948 British nationals in the Uganda Protectorate were reclassified at that time as "Citizens of the UK and Colonies" (CUKC). The basic British nationality scheme did not change overmuch, and typically those who were previously defined as British remained the same. Changes included that wives and children no longer automatically acquired the status of the husband or father, children who acquired nationality by descent no longer were required to make a retention declaration, and registrations for children born abroad were extended.

==== Indigenous persons (British Protected Persons) in the Uganda Protectorate (1914–1960) ====
British protectorates, in 1914, were considered to be foreign territories lacking an internal government. When Britain extended this status over a territory, it took responsibility for both internal and external administration, including defense and foreign relations. Indigenous persons who were born in a protectorate were known as British Protected Persons and were not entitled to be British nationals. BPPs had no right of return to the United Kingdom and were unable to exercise rights of citizenship; however, they could be issued a passport and could access diplomatic services when traveling abroad. In 1914, the Alien Restriction Act clarified that while BPPs were not nationals, neither were they aliens. When the law was amended in 1919, that provision remained the same, meaning that BPPs could not naturalise. Until 1934, when the British Protected Persons Order was drafted, the status of BPP was not statutory, but rather granted at the prerogative of the monarch. Under the 1934 Order, Belonger status with regard to protected territories was defined to mean persons born before or after the Order in a protectorate who possessed no nationality and were not a British subject, or persons born abroad to a native of a protectorate who were stateless and not British subjects. The statute extended BPP status to children and wives of BPPs, if they were stateless, and specifically provided that if a woman married someone who was a national of another nation, she lost her BPP status.

In 1943, the British Nationality Act clarified that BPPs born abroad in territories that were within the Crown's dominions were British subjects by virtue of jus soli, but those born within a protectorate were not subjects. Under the terms of the British Nationality Act 1948, BPPs of the Uganda Protectorate status did not change. However, the Act, while retaining the provisions that BPPs were not aliens and could not naturalise, allowed BPPs to register as BPP of a protected place or as a British subject under certain conditions. In 1949, the British Protectorates, Protected States and Protected Persons Order in Council repealed former orders about BPPs and detailed provisions for conferring protected status. It provided that protected persons were BPPs of a protectorate if they were born there; if they were born abroad to a father who was a native of a protectorate; or if at the time of their birth their father was a BPP. It also allowed women married to BPPs to register as a BPP and allowed certain nationals of foreign countries to register as BPPs. Minor changes to protected persons' status were made by Orders of Council in 1952, 1953, 1958, 1960, 1961, and 1962, but major changes did not occur until 1965.

=== Post-independence (1962–present) ===
Uganda gained independence from Britain on 9 October 1962. Under the terms of the independence constitution, those who were conferred Ugandan nationality at that time were CUKCs or BPPs who had been born in the territory to a father or paternal grandfather also born in Uganda, or persons who were born outside the country to a father who became a national, or would have become a national except for his death, at independence. To reduce the political and economic advantages that British subjects who were Asian had enjoyed, at independence, these communities were not considered eligible for Ugandan nationality. A two-year transitional period was established for persons who were not automatically conferred nationality to acquire it through registration on the basis that they had previously been naturalised or registered in Uganda or that they were married to a husband who became, or would have become if he had not died, a national at independence. Persons who were conferred Ugandan nationality ceased to be British subjects, but those who did not become Ugandan were able to retain their status as British, as the constitution did not allow dual nationality.

Provisions for acquisition after independence included anyone born in Uganda, whether the parents were native or foreign, as long as the father did not possess diplomatic immunity and was not an enemy alien. Children born abroad acquired nationality through a father also born in Uganda and women could register for Ugandan nationality upon marriage with a Ugandan. The constitution called for the drafting of legislation to specify other conditions to acquire or lose nationality. Uganda passed the 1962 Citizenship Act, which basically carried the same provisions as the independence constitution. but added stipluations that naturalisation could be acquired after a five-year residency over the previous seven-year period and that Commonwealth citizens, persons who were born in Uganda to parents born outside of Uganda, and persons who were ordinary residents of Uganda but had been born in Kenya, Tanzania or Zanzibar could register after five years of residence. Uganda adopted a new constitution on 9 October 1963, when it became a republic and amended the Citizenship Act twice that year. Act 57 of 1963 added a provision that temporary passes or permits did not serve as proof for residency and Act 84 of 1963 added a provision for wives of Ugandans to be registered as Ugandan. A Statutory Instrument (SI 166) was passed in 1964 to transfer authority over naturalisation processes from the president to the appropriate government ministry.

Though around 25,000 applications for registration occurred within the transition period specified, because the constitution had not specified a period in which they were to be reviewed, by 9 October 1964, only about half of the applications were ever processed. In March 1966, Uganda's Prime Minister declared a state of emergency and suspended the constitution. A temporary constitution was put in place in April, which contained no changes to the rules of acquiring nationality. A permanent constitution became effective on 7 September 1967 which changed the scheme of acquiring nationality from birth in Uganda to birth in Uganda and descent from a Ugandan, who could be either the father or mother, or any of the grandparents. For those born outside the country, the 1967 Constitution specified that a child could acquire nationality from its Ugandan mother, but only from its Ugandan father if he had also been born in Uganda. Registration for nationality upon marriage of a woman with a Ugandan husband remained in the provisions.

The 1971 Ugandan coup d'état would lead to the expulsion of the Asian-Ugandan community from the territory. The Idi Amin declared himself president and decreed that the unprocessed applications for registration from 1964 were cancelled. Allowing that they could be resubmitted, he then passed the Immigration Decree Amendment of 1972 which cancelled visas, permits, residency certificates which had been issued to persons of Asian origin. He demanded that Britain assume responsibility to remove all CUKSs and BPPs from Bangladesh, India, and Pakistan on or before 9 November 1972 and that those where were expelled leave all their property in the country. Those who held Ugandan nationality were required to verify their registration, which had required that they renounce any other nationality in order to qualify as Ugandan. A subsequent decree in October 1972, removed the requirement that those being expelled have other nationality. Amin was exiled in 1979, and in 1983, the new government passed the Expropriated Properties Act, which returned confiscated businesses and personal properties to those persons who had been expelled. The Act did not restore their nationality, but allowed Asian-Ugandans to challenge their loss of nationality through the Directorate of Citizenship and Immigration. In some cases the situation still led to generational statelessness, as Uganda does not allow children to acquire nationality when their parent becomes Ugandan through registration or naturalization.

In 1989, a Constitutional Commission was charged with drafting a new constitution and over several years carried out consultations with the Ugandan public. In September 1995, the new constitution was adopted. Under its terms, Uganda reinstated provisions for nationality to be acquired by birth in Uganda as long as the person's parent or grandparents belonged to an ethnic group living in Uganda before 1 February 1926. The schedule attached omitted any Asian ethnicities and included only indigenous ethnic groups of African descent, as a basis for qualification of nationality. It retained provisions for acquisition by descent, but specified that children born anywhere could acquire nationality if at least one parent or grandparent was Ugandan and born in Uganda. The Constitution of 1995 also introduced the acquisition of nationality for children of unknown parents found in Uganda; for those who had been living in Uganda since independence, as long as their parents weren't refugees or held diplomatic immunity; established equality in acquiring nationality upon marriage; and retained the ban on dual nationality. The Citizenship and Immigration Control Act of 1999 reiterated the constitutional provisions and created a new Citizenship and Immigration Board to curtail the discretionary authority of the Ugandan Ministry of Internal Affairs.

In 2001 a new Constitutional Commission was established which reviewed requirements for acquisition of nationality. The Commission recommended authorizing dual nationality, which was adopted in the 2005 amended constitution. Nine additional indigenous groups were also added to the list of qualifying ethnicities. Four years later, in 2009 amendments were passed to the established public positions which could not hold dual nationality and detailed procedures for naturalising applicants to retain other nationality, without requiring renunciation of other nationality. To allow those who had previously lost nationality because they were dual nationals, the 2009 Amendment allowed persons to repatriate as long as a review of their application confirmed to the Immigration Board that they posed no threat to the security or public order of the country.

== See also ==
- Ugandan passport
