= Visa policy of Kenya =

Policy on permits required to enter Kenya

Kenya has abolished visa requirements for all foreign visitors from 1 January 2024, and instead implemented an Electronic Travel Authorisation (eTA) system.

Most visitors must obtain an eTA prior to travel unless they are citizens of eTA-exempted countries.

== Visa policy map ==
Visa policy of Kenya (All visitors are visa exempt for 90 days) Kenya eTA not required and may enter with ID card eTA not required eTA required for a fee

External image
- Kenya international border crossing points

== Electronic Travel Authorisation (eTA) ==
Electronic Travel Authorisation (eTA)

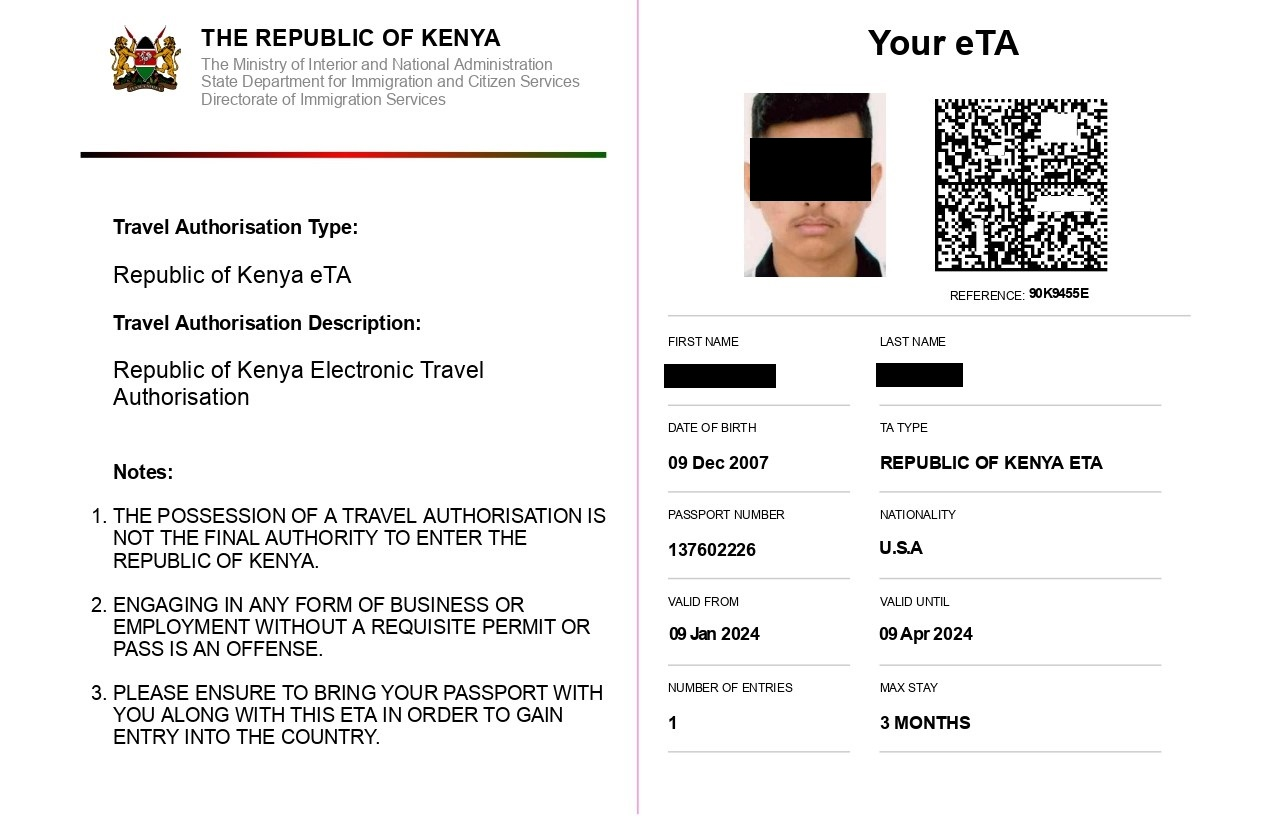
- Sample of Kenyan Electronic Travel Authorisation (eTA)
- Owner: Directorate of Immigration Services
- Website: etakenya.go.ke

From 1 January 2024, citizens of all countries except those listed below must apply for an eTA in advance. Here are some details about eTA application:

- Applications can be submitted up to 90 days prior to travel and must be submitted at least 3 days in advance.
- eTA fee is USD 32.50.
- eTA is good for single entry, but visitors who leave Kenya to other EAC countries may re-enter provided that their eTA is still valid.
- Proof of reservation at the hotel where you plan to stay is required (if staying with friends, an invitation letter is also acceptable).
- Yellow fever vaccination certificate is required if coming from endemic countries.

=== Exemption ===
Citizens of the following countries do not need an eTA before entering Kenya:

180 days

- Burundi
- DR Congo
- Rwanda^{ID}
- South Sudan
- Tanzania
- Uganda^{ID}

90 days

- Bahamas
- Barbados
- Belize
- Botswana
- Brunei
- Comoros
- Republic of the Congo
- Cyprus
- Dominica
- Eritrea
- Eswatini
- Ethiopia
- Fiji
- Gambia
- Ghana
- Grenada
- Guyana
- Jamaica
- Kiribati
- Lesotho
- Malawi
- Malaysia
- Maldives
- Mauritius
- Mozambique
- Namibia
- Nauru
- Papua New Guinea
- Saint Kitts and Nevis
- Saint Lucia
- Saint Vincent and the Grenadines
- Samoa
- San Marino
- Seychelles
- Sierra Leone
- Singapore
- South Africa
- Tonga
- Trinidad and Tobago
- Tuvalu
- Vanuatu
- Zambia
- Zimbabwe

60 days

- Algeria
- Angola
- Benin
- Burkina Faso
- Cape Verde
- Cameroon
- Central African Republic
- Chad
- Côte d'Ivoire
- Djibouti
- Egypt
- Equatorial Guinea
- Gabon
- Guinea
- Guinea-Bissau
- Liberia
- Madagascar
- Mali
- Mauritania
- Morocco
- Niger
- Nigeria
- Sao Tome and Principe
- Senegal
- Sudan
- Togo
- Tunisia

_{ID - May enter Kenya with a national ID card in lieu of a passport.}

=== Future changes ===
Kenya has signed visa exemption agreements with the following countries, but they have not yet entered into force:

Country	Passports	Agreement signed on
Angola	All	21 October 2023
Indonesia	Ordinary	21 August 2023

== East African Tourist Visa ==
In February 2014, Kenya, Rwanda and Uganda issued an East African Tourist Visa. The visa fee USD 100 and has no restrictions on nationality. It is a non-extendable multiple-entry 90-day visa that has to be first used to enter the country that issued it.

== History ==
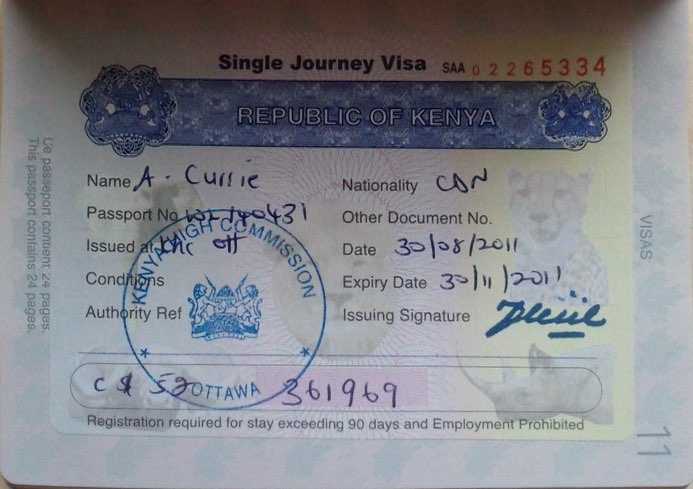
Kenyan single journey visa sticker

The San Marino-United Kingdom visa exemption agreement of 1949 was extended for Kenya and San Marino in 1963 and still applies.

The agreement is of symbolic value for Kenyan citizens but does have an effect on San Marino passport holders.

On 30 October 2023, President William Ruto of Kenya declared the forthcoming elimination of visa requirements for all African visitors by the end of the year.

An updated statement was issued during Kenya's 60th Independence Day celebrations on 12 December 2023, wherein the president declared that the decree would be expanded to encompass all countries globally, commencing in January 2024.

In addition, the following groups were also exempt from visas:

- Children under age 16, regardless of nationality;
- Passengers in transit, if they do not leave the ship or the international transit area of the airport;
- Holders of diplomatic, official or service passports of Brazil, Cuba and Turkey, of diplomatic and service passports of China and Iran, and of diplomatic passports of India, Israel and Nigeria;
- Holders of laissez-passers issued by Africa Re, African Airlines Travel Association, African Housing Fund, African Development Bank, African Union of Broadcasting, African Union, Arab Bank for Economic Development in Africa, Common Market for Eastern and Southern Africa, Desert Locust Control Organization for Central and Southern Africa, Environment Liaison Centre International, European Union, Intergovernmental Authority on Development, International Labour Organization, International Monetary Fund, International Potato Center, International Red Locust Control Organization for Central and Southern Africa, United Nations and the World Bank;
- Serving members of the British Armed Forces;
- Crew members of aircraft for up to 7 days, and of ships for up to 14 days;
- Owners of private aircraft stopping for refueling without leaving the airport.

On 30 May 2025, the ETA program received significant amendments, expanding the list of nationals exempt from obtaining the ETA to most African nationals (except nationals of Libya and Somalia), as well as other countries that were previously visa-exempt prior to the introduction of the ETA program.

== See also ==
- Visa requirements for Kenyan citizens
