= Kenyan nationality law =

Kenya Citizenship and Immigration Act

Kenyan National Assembly
- Long title: An Act of Parliament to provide for matters relating to citizenship; issuance of travel documents; immigration and for connected purposes
- Citation: Cap. 170
- Enacted by: Government of Kenya
- Assented to: 27 August 2011
- Date of expiry: 30 August 2011

Related legislation
- Kenya Citizenship Act (Cap. 170); Immigration Act (Cap. 172); Aliens Restriction Act (Cap. 173)
- Status: Current legislation

Kenyan nationality law is regulated by the Constitution of Kenya, as amended; the Kenya Citizenship and Immigration Act, and its revisions; and various international agreements to which the country is a signatory. These laws determine who is, or is eligible to be, a national of Kenya. The legal means to acquire nationality, formal legal membership in a nation, differ from the domestic relationship of rights and obligations between a national and the nation, known as citizenship. Nationality describes the relationship of an individual to the state under international law, whereas citizenship is the domestic relationship of an individual within the nation. In Britain and thus the Commonwealth of Nations, though the terms are often used synonymously outside of law, they are governed by different statutes and regulated by different authorities. Kenyan nationality is typically obtained under the principle of jus soli, by being born in Kenya, or jus sanguinis, i.e. by birth in Kenya or abroad to parents with Kenyan nationality. It can be granted to persons with an affiliation to the country, or to a permanent resident who has lived in the country for a given period of time through registration.

== Acquisition of nationality ==
Nationality can be acquired in Kenya at birth or later in life through registration.

=== By birth ===
Those who acquire nationality at birth include:

- Children born anywhere to at least one parent with Kenyan nationality;
- Children born in Kenya to foreigners prior to 12 December 1963, who on that date were British Protected Persons or Citizens of the UK and Colonies; or
- Foundlings or orphans up to age eight, discovered in Kenyan territory.

=== By registration ===
Naturalisation, known in Kenya since 2010 as registration, can be granted to persons who understand Kiswahili or another dialect of the territory and have resided in the territory for a sufficient period of time to confirm they understand the customs and traditions of Kenya. General provisions are that applicants have good character and conduct; are of legal capacity; have not been convicted of a crime carrying a sentence of more than three years; have not been declared bankrupt; and have the ability to contribute substantively to the development of the nation. Applicants must typically have resided in the country for seven years. Besides foreigners meeting the criteria, other persons who may be registered include:

- Children legally adopted by a Kenyan parent, at the time of completion of a legal adoption can register for Kenyan nationality;
- The spouse of a Kenyan national after seven years of marriage without a residency requirement;
- The widow or widower of a Kenyan national who would have been eligible for registration after seven years except for the death of their spouse;
- Stateless or migrant persons who have continuously lived in Kenya since birth in the territory; who meet the language, cultural understanding, and lack of criminal record registration requirements; and who intend to remain in Kenya; or
- Minor children may automatically be registered when their parent acquires nationality.

== Loss of nationality ==
Kenyan nationals can renounce their nationality pending approval by the state. Kenyans of origin may not be deprived of their nationality. Registered persons may be denaturalized in Kenya for committing crimes against the state or state security; ordinary crimes; or for fraud, misrepresentation, or concealment in a registration petition. Persons who previously had nationality and wish to repatriate if they voluntarily lost their status because of dual nationality must request reinstatement.

== Dual nationality ==
Dual nationality is typically allowed in Kenya for persons of origin since 2010. However, persons who hold the presidency or the deputy presidency, or other high positions in the state, are not allowed to have multiple nationalities.

== History ==
=== African empires and Arabic/European contact (1498–1895) ===
The territory that now is known as Kenya was settled for millennia by migratory people who did not form centralized states or empires. Commerce between Bantu- and Swahili-speaking people with traders from the Arabian Peninsula, the Indian Ocean, and the Persian Gulf led to the spread of Islam amongst the inhabitants by the twelfth century. In 1498, the Portuguese navigator and explorer Vasco da Gama landed at Mombasa and Malindi, forming an alliance with the Sultan of the latter. By the turn of the century, the Portuguese had forced out Muslim traders in the region, burning and looting Mombasa multiple times to gain control over the center of trade on the coast. Their most important trading center was built at Fort Jesus in 1591. Conflict between the Portuguese and the Omani Empire continued until 1729, when the Portuguese were ousted from the region. During the reign (1807–1856) of Sultan Sayyid Said, Omani subjects (Arabic: ra'īya) were recognized as all Africans, Arabs, and Kutchi people residing in Oman or Zanzibar. In 1820 an Anglo-French agreement was reached to suppress piracy and the slave trade along the southern end of the Arabian Peninsula. Within three years, naval patrols regularly cruised the coastlines to administer the truce. Britain saw these patrols as necessary in the anti-slavery movement, as well as to protect commerce routes to India. In 1832 the Omani Empire moved its court seat to Zanzibar. At its height, Omani territory spanned from Somalia through Kenya to Mozambique and subjects of the sultan migrated inland to the Congo. Zanzibar flourished as the trading center, involved in both the agricultural and slave trade. After abolition of the transatlantic slave trade in Britain in 1833 and France in 1848, an illegal slave trade in East Africa soared using small vessels throughout the Indian Ocean.

In 1856, France authorized captives to be purchased and freed in exchange for an indentured labor contract to work on French colonial plantations, typically for seven years. British seizures of these small boats caused significant economic loss to the Sultan and angered the French because of the disruption to commerce. Upon the death of the sultan that year, a succession crisis occurred. The result was that the Sultanate of Zanzibar separated from Oman in 1861. Upon the separation, Sultan Thuwaini bin Said decreed that Lawati and Khoja people, regardless of whether they lived in Zanzibar or Oman, were his subjects because of their previous settlement in Oman. In 1865, Sayyid Majid bin Said, the first Sultan of Zanzibar, decreed that married women followed the nationality of their spouse, losing their Omani-Zanzibari status if the husband was foreign. Pressured to concede to prohibition of the slave trade in 1873, the Sultan's actions destabilized the economy of the region and angered his subjects involved in commerce. In an effort to curtail revolt by Arab traders, Britain and Germany proposed that they intervene to protect the sovereignty of the sultan.

At the Berlin Conference which occurred in 1884 and 1885, Britain and Germany each had competing claims to the territory that now comprises Kenya and Tanzania. In 1886, the two nations came to an agreement dividing the territory into three areas. Establishing a line north of Mount Kilimanjaro from Pemba Island on the west coast to Lake Victoria, the territory was divided in two parts. The ten-mile-wide strip of land between the Tana and Ruvuma Rivers designated as the Sultanate of Zanzibar formed the third part of the territory. Under the Anglo-German Agreement, the Sultan retained his sovereignty, though he leased concessions for fifty years to Germany in 1886 and Britain in 1887. Britain acquired the territory to the north of the line, while Germany controlled the area to the south. The Imperial British East Africa Company was granted a royal charter to administer the territory in 1888, but in 1895, the charter was surrendered.

=== British colony (1895–1963) ===
Britain established the East Africa Protectorate in 1895 and in 1902, shifted the border westward claiming part of what had been territory of the Uganda Protectorate. In 1920, the entire territory of the East Africa Protectorate was annexed by Britain with the majority of the territory forming the Crown Colony of Kenya. In 1921, the coastal strip of the Sultanate of Zanzibar and adjoining lands of Jubaland, Kismayu, Lamu, Patta and Port Durnford were designated as the Kenya Protectorate. Four years later, Jubaland, Kismayu and Port Durnford were ceded to Somalia. In Britain, allegiance, in which subjects pledged to support a monarch, was the precursor to the modern concept of nationality. The crown recognised from 1350 that all persons born within the territories of the British Empire were subjects. Those born outside the realm — except children of those serving in an official post abroad, children of the monarch, and children born on a British sailing vessel — were considered by common law to be foreigners. Marriage did not affect the status of a subject of the realm, except that under common law, single women, including divorcées, were not allowed to be parents thus their children could not derive nationality maternally and were stateless unless legitimated by their father. Nationality laws passed by the British Parliament were extended only to the Kingdom of Great Britain, and later the United Kingdom of Great Britain and Ireland. When British protectorates were established in 1815, there was little difference between the rights of British subjects and protected persons.

==== Persons in the Kenya Colony and British-born subjects living in the Kenya Protectorate (1914–1963) ====
In 1911, at the Imperial Conference a decision was made to draft a common nationality code for use across the empire. The British Nationality and Status of Aliens Act 1914 allowed local jurisdictions in the self-governing Dominions to continue regulating nationality in their territories, but also established an imperial nationality scheme throughout the realm. The uniform law, which went into effect on 1 January 1915, required a married woman to derive her nationality from her spouse, meaning if he was British, she was also, and if he was foreign, so was she. It stipulated that upon loss of nationality of a husband, a wife could declare that she wished to remain British and provided that if a marriage had terminated, through death or divorce, a British-born national who had lost her status through marriage could reacquire British nationality through naturalisation without meeting a residency requirement. The statute reiterated common law provisions for natural-born persons born within the realm on or after the effective date. By using the word person, the statute nullified legitimacy requirements for jus soli nationals. For those born abroad on or after the effective date, legitimacy was still required, and could only be derived by a child from a British father (one generation), who was natural-born or naturalised. Naturalisations required five years residence or service to the crown.

Amendments to the British Nationality Act were enacted in 1918, 1922, 1933 and 1943 changing derivative nationality by descent and modifying slightly provisions for women to lose their nationality upon marriage. Because of a rise in statelessness, a woman who did not automatically acquire her husband's nationality upon marriage or upon his naturalisation in another country, did not lose their British status after 1933. The 1943 revision allowed a child born abroad at any time to be a British national by descent if the Secretary of State agreed to register the birth. Under the terms of the British Nationality Act 1948 British nationals in the Kenya Colony were reclassified at that time as "Citizens of the UK and Colonies" (CUKC). The basic British nationality scheme did not change overmuch, and typically those who were previously defined as British remained the same. Changes included that wives and children no longer automatically acquired the status of the husband or father, children who acquired nationality by descent no longer were required to make a retention declaration, and registrations for children born abroad were extended.

==== Indigenous persons (British Protected Persons) in the Kenya Protectorate (1914–1965) ====
British protectorates, in 1914, were considered to be foreign territories lacking an internal government. When Britain extended this status over a territory, it took responsibility for both internal and external administration, including defense and foreign relations. Indigenous persons who were born in a protectorate were known as British Protected Persons (BPP) and were not entitled to be British subjects. BPPs had no right of return to the United Kingdom and were unable to exercise rights of citizenship; however, they could be issued a passport and could access diplomatic services when traveling abroad. In 1914, the Alien Restriction Act clarified that while BPPs were not nationals, neither were they aliens. When the law was amended in 1919, that provision remained the same, meaning that BPPs could not naturalise. Until 1934, when the British Protected Persons Order was drafted, the status of BPP was not statutory, but rather granted at the prerogative of the monarch. Under the 1934 Order, Belonger status with regard to protected territories was defined to mean persons born before or after the Order in a protectorate who possessed no nationality and were not a British subject, or persons born abroad to a native of a protectorate who were stateless and not British subjects. The statute extended BPP status to children and wives of BPPs, if they were stateless, and specifically provided that if a woman married someone who was a national of another nation, she lost her BPP status.

In 1943, the British Nationality Act clarified that BPPs born abroad in territories that were within the crown's dominions were British subjects by virtue of jus soli, but those born within a protectorate were not subjects. Under the terms of the British Nationality Act 1948, BPPs of Kenya had no change in status. However, the Act, while retaining the provisions that BPPs were not aliens and could not naturalise, allowed BPPs to register as BPP of a protected place or as a British subject under certain conditions. In 1949, the British Protectorates, Protected States and Protected Persons Order in Council repealed former orders about BPPs and detailed provisions for conferring protected status. It provided that protected persons were BPPs of a protectorate if they were born there; if they were born abroad to a father who was a native of a protectorate; or if at the time of their birth their father was a BPP. It also allowed women married to BPPs to register as a BPP and allowed certain nationals of foreign countries to register as BPPs. Minor changes to protected persons' status were made by Orders of Council in 1952, 1953, 1958, 1960, 1961, and 1962, but major changes did not occur until 1965.

=== Post-independence (1963–present) ===
Kenya gained independence on 12 December 1963 and the Kenya Colony and Kenya Protectorate were combined into a single sovereign state, when the Sultan of Zanzibar ceded his territory effective with independence. The Independence Constitution provided that any CUKC or BPP who was born in Kenya as of independence to at least one parent born in Kenya became a Kenyan national and ceased to be British. For persons born abroad, those descended of a father who became or would have become except for his death, a national of Kenya at independence were also conferred Kenyan nationality. Persons whose father was ineligible for conference of Kenyan nationality were allowed to register as Kenyans before 12 December 1965, if they had a habitual residence in the territory, if they had been naturalised or registered in Kenya prior to independence, if they had been born in Kenyan territory, or if they had been married to a Kenyan who obtained, or would have obtained Kenyan status except for death, at independence. Anyone who had been a CUKC or BPP and was ineligible for Kenyan nationality remained a CUKC or BPP of Britain. Persons born after independence acquired nationality if they were born in Kenya to at least one parent who was Kenyan or if they were born abroad to a father who was Kenyan, as long as they did not have parents who were nationals of a country at war with Kenya or who had diplomatic immunity. The constitution also allowed foreign women married to Kenyans and any African or commonwealth citizen residing in Kenya for a period to be specified in law to be registered as Kenyan. Those who naturalised or registered were required to renounce any other nationality, as dual nationality was forbidden.

Subsequent to independence, the Kenyan National Assembly enacted the Kenya Citizenship Act 1963 which supplemented the constitutional provisions for nationality. It did not add new provisions, but clarified details on acquisition and loss of status. For example, it provided that Africans who had no nationality in an independent African nation could acquire Kenyan status through registration by proving they or their parents were born in an African country and had lived in that country for at least ten years, had for five years been an ordinary resident of Kenya, spoke English or Swahili, and would be a citizen of good character in Kenya. However, in some areas, it created conflict, such as Section 3, regarding registrations, which specified that to be registered the applicant had to be of African descent, a provision which was not in the Constitution. This meant that it was difficult for Kenya's large Asian population to register for Kenyan nationality and as intended, many of them relocated to Britain.

A new constitution was adopted in 1964 making the country a republic. Though numerous amendments to the constitution occurred, until the adoption of the 1985 amendments, the provisions for nationality largely remained the same. The 1985 Constitution changed the basis of nationality from jus soli to jus sanguinis, meaning that it was no longer adequate to be born to a parent also born in Kenya, but the parent must have been a Kenyan national. The 1985 Constitution was effective retroactively to independence, meaning that it deprived persons, who had been Kenyan nationals by virtue of having been born after independence in Kenya but to parents who were foreign, of having Kenyan status rendering them stateless. (Note: According to Laurie Fransman, an expert on British nationality legislation, as Britain does not as a general policy recognise retrospective nationality legislation, those who became stateless as a result of the 1985 Kenyan Constitution did not reacquire any British status.) In 1998, the government began a process to rewrite the constitution. The Kenyan National Assembly passed the Children's Act, which guaranteed minors the right to Kenyan nationality in 2001. The first draft of the constitution was rejected in a referendum in 2005, for several reasons, but regarding nationality, the issues were gender disparity and lack of provision for dual nationality.

In 2010, Kenya adopted the second draft of the constitution, which allowed children to equally acquire nationality from either parent and married persons to equally acquire nationality regardless of the gender of the spouse. Under the 2010 Constitution, different schemes of obtaining nationality later than birth were combined into a single process of registration and dual nationality was allowed. There were no provisions in the 2010 Constitution which addressed statelessness. In 2009, a case was brought before the African Committee of Experts on the Rights and Welfare of the Child by the Institute for Human Rights and Development in Africa and the Open Society Foundations on behalf of Nubian children in Kenya, alleging that they were denied nationality. In a landmark decision issued in 2011, the Committee found that Kenyan provisions for stateless persons to acquire nationality under the 2010 Constitution, violated Article 6 of the African Charter on the Rights and Welfare of the Child. Because Kenyan law treated Nubians as foreigners, they were subject to discrimination, leaving them unable to obtain nationality or an identity card from independence. Lack of nationality of Nubian parents, led to stateless children because of the difficulty in registering births, as documentation of the parents' identity was problematic, perpetuating generations of statelessness. The case had implications for other groups in Kenya, such as Somali and Makonde migrants or intersex people, who have difficulty in providing documentation or whose ability to meet the requirements are impacted because of low literacy and financial means.

The Kenya Citizenship and Immigration Act (No. 12 of 2011), subsequently was passed to regulate the constitutional provisions for nationality. Under its terms, while those who gained nationality under the 1985 constitution were acknowledged as retaining that status, modifications were made. The Act of 2011, made retroactive the new provision for children born abroad to Kenyan mothers to derive their nationality. It granted nationality of origin to CUKCs and BPPS who were born to non-nationals in Kenya prior to 12 December 1963, instead of nationality by registration. Adding provisions for foundlings, the new law specified that after an investigative process by the Department of Children Services, if the origin and parentage of a child under eight years old cannot be determined, a court was authorized to grant them Kenyan nationality from birth. The law provided for the equal ability to derive nationality after a seven-year waiting period from the marriage or permanent residency after the third year of marriage. Regardless of whether a spouse met the duration requirements for marriage, divorcées were ineligible for Kenyan nationality, but widows or widowers could register on the presumption that had the spouse lived they would have been able to meet the seven-year duration requirement. Dual nationality was allowed for Kenyan nationals of origin, as long as the acquisition was disclosed within three months of having been obtained.

The 2011 Act provided requirements for stateless persons or migrants to obtain nationality for a five-year period, if they could prove that their parents were stateless or long-term migrants who arrived in the country before 1963; if they personally held no identity documents of another nation; if they had continuously lived in Kenya since birth in the territory; if they intended to remain in Kenya; and that they met the language, cultural understanding, and lack of criminal record registration requirements. In reaction to the African Committee of Experts on the Rights and Welfare of the Child decision, an amendment to the Kenya Citizenship and Immigration Act was passed in 2012. It allowed the Cabinet Secretary of Foreign Affairs to waive documentation requirements for stateless persons who had resided in Kenya prior to 1963, as long as they met the other registration requirements. In 2016, the Cabinet extended the application period for stateless and migrant persons for an additional three years. When that period expired, a task force was established in 2019 to identify stateless persons and register them over the coming year.
