= Visa policy of Uganda =

Policy on permit required to enter Uganda

Visitors to Uganda must obtain an e-Visa, unless they come from one of the visa exempt countries.

All visitors must hold a passport valid for 6 months.

== Visa policy map ==
Uganda Visa not required eVisa

== Visa exemption ==
Citizens of the following countries and territories can visit Uganda without a visa for up to 3 months (unless otherwise noted):

- Angola
- Antigua and Barbuda
- Bahamas
- Barbados
- Belize
- Botswana
- Burundi
- Comoros
- Cyprus
- DR Congo
- Eritrea
- Eswatini
- Fiji
- Gambia
- Ghana
- Grenada
- Hong Kong
- Ireland
- Jamaica
- Kenya
- Lesotho
- Madagascar
- Malawi
- Malaysia
- Malta
- Mauritius
- Rwanda
- Saint Vincent and the Grenadines
- Seychelles
- Sierra Leone
- Singapore
- Solomon Islands
- South Sudan (6 months)
- Tanzania
- Trinidad and Tobago
- Tonga
- United Arab Emirates
- Vanuatu
- Zambia
- Zimbabwe

A visa exemption agreement for all passports holders was signed with Mozambique in September 2024 and it is yet to be ratified.

=== Non-ordinary passports ===
Holders of diplomatic or service passports issued to nationals of India, Italy, Namibia and South Africa do not require a visa for 3 months.

- A visa exemption agreement for holders of diplomatic and official / service passports was signed with Ethiopia in August 2019, but it has not yet entered into force.

== Electronic Visa (e-Visa) ==
Uganda began issuing electronic visas on 1 July 2016. Passengers who have been issued an e-Visa must travel with a printed e-Visa confirmation.

== East African Tourist Visa ==
The 90-day East African Tourist Visa is also available on arrival, which is valid for Uganda, Kenya, and Rwanda if first used in the country that issued the visa.The fee for this visa is 100 USD.

== Somalia ==
Entry and transit is refused to Somalia nationals if not holding a biometric passport, even if not leaving the aircraft and proceeding by the same flight.

== See also ==
- Visa requirements for Ugandan citizens
