= Ethiopia–Israel relations =

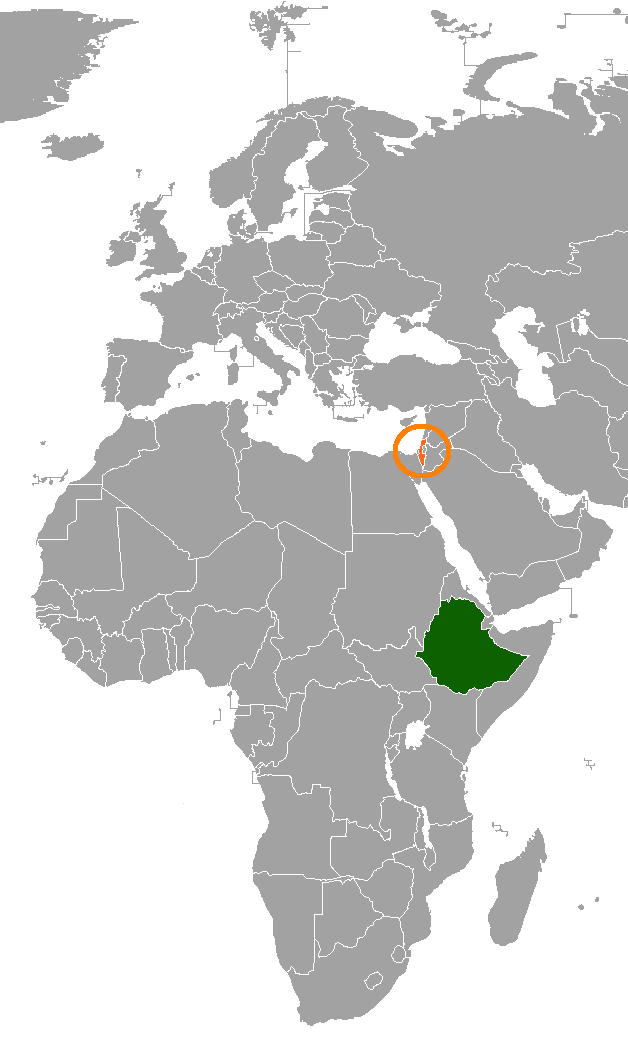

- Ethiopia: Israel

Ethiopia–Israel relations are foreign relations between Ethiopia and Israel. Both countries re-established diplomatic relations in 1992. Ethiopia has an embassy in Tel Aviv. Israel has an embassy in Addis Ababa.

Israel has been one of Ethiopia's most reliable suppliers of military assistance, supporting different Ethiopian governments during the Eritrean War of Independence and the Ogaden War.

== History ==
=== Royal Era ===
The Ethiopian Empire was one of ten countries that voted to abstain on the United Nations (UN) Partition Plan for Palestine in 1947, which proposed dividing Mandatory Palestine into Jewish and non-Jewish states.

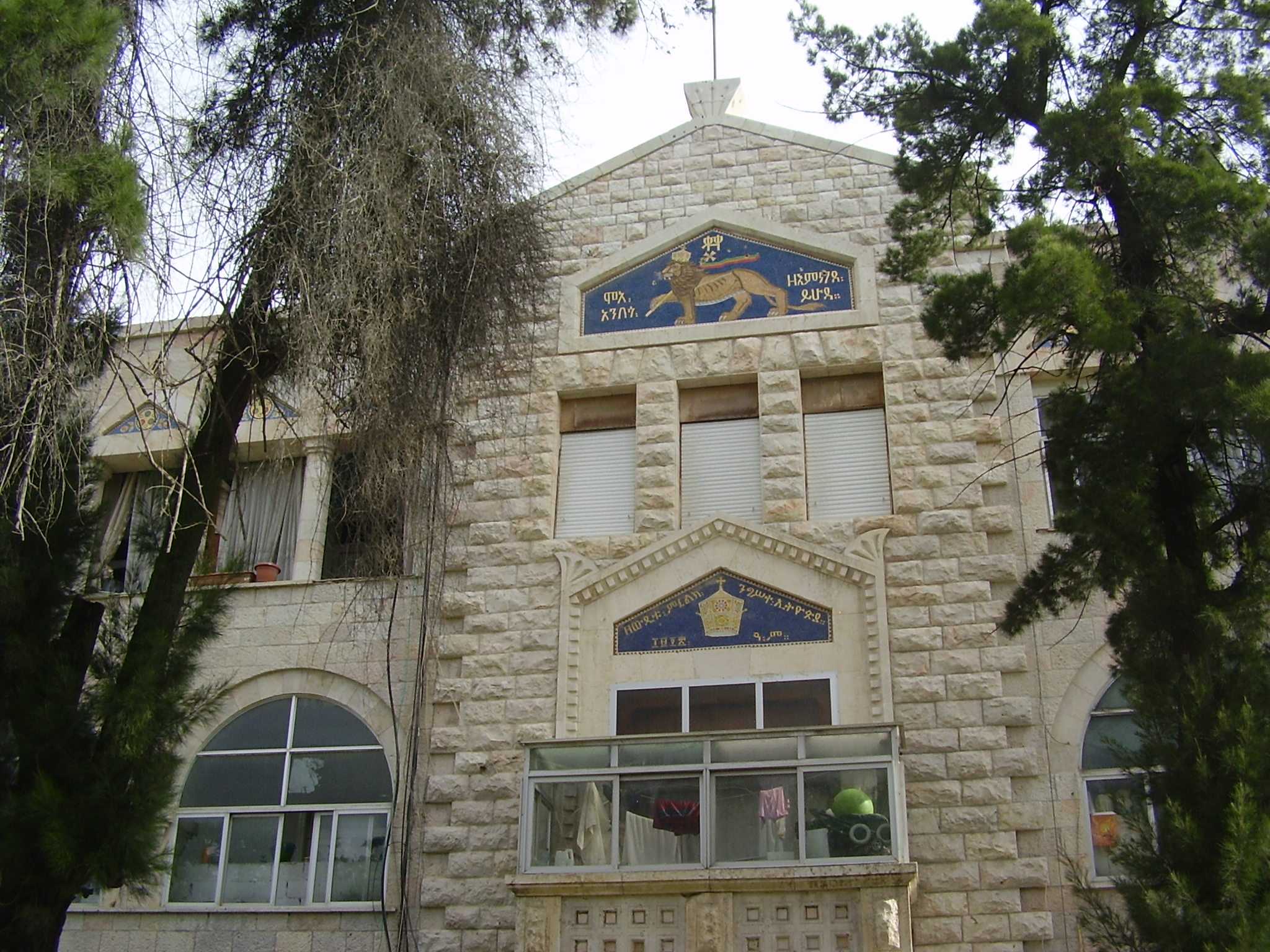
Ethiopian consulate in Jerusalem

During the reign of Emperor Haile Selassie, Israeli advisers trained paratroops and counterinsurgency units belonging to the Fifth Division (also called the Nebelbal, 'Flame', Division). In December 1960, elements of the Ethiopian army attempted a coup whilst the emperor was on a state visit in Brazil. Israel intervened in support of Sellasie.

The alignment between Ethiopia and Israel during the mid-20th century was largely driven by common strategic concerns, particularly the shared threat posed by Nasserist Egypt. Beginning in 1959, Israel prioritized the establishment of strong ties with Ethiopia, investing significant resources into this relationship. Even before formal diplomatic relations were established, Israel had already made substantial contributions to Ethiopia in areas such as training, knowledge-sharing, and infrastructure development.

Throughout the 1960s, many of Israel’s senior military and security officials visited Ethiopia, underscoring the importance of the relationship. For instance, in March 1963, Shimon Peres and Yitzhak Rabin spent a week in Ethiopia, meeting with Emperor Haile Selassie, his ministers, and military leaders. Their visit reflected Israel's strategic interest in Ethiopia, particularly in relation to the Blue Nile, “where the life of Egypt begins,” as Peres put it. Peres wrote a forty-page top secret report on Ethiopia and Israeli interests that contained this long excerpt:

"Ethiopia’s intelligentsia is far larger than that in other African countries, but its poverty is African. The land is ethnically diversified, but most groups are under the hegemony of one, the Amharas. The country, however, is in a transitory stage. On the one hand, it is immersed in expectations and tensions, but on the other hand, it is equipped with strong tradition and much patience. . . . The people have fought bravely throughout history and won their independence but they have won little welfare and meager progress. A new generation, vocal yet capable, is yearning to assume leadership, but it faces an old guard that is articulate, experienced, and stubborn. It is possible the emperor may be assassinated. It is possible his heir may be deposed. It is possible a constitutional monarchy will emerge. It is possible that the young army officers will ally themselves with the university students. It is equally possible that these revolutionary officers will ally themselves with the proletariat of the countryside. Nasser is quite popular in wide circles, but only as a model for revolutionary change. Egypt is widely seen as the enemy, but what happens in Egypt’s domestic affairs—not what it does in foreign strategy—is something they consider worth following. This prerevolutionary atmosphere does not change the basic facts: Ethiopia is a large and important country, it is neither Arab nor Muslim. Christians are the majority and they are filled with a deep historical sense in whose heart Israel features squarely. Ethiopia is situated south of Egypt and holds the key to Egypt’s very future, for it controls the Blue Nile. Ethiopia has an army, a proud military tradition, and it respects Israel and would gradually like to become allied with us. Israel should work intensively and carefully. Ethiopia is a vital element in our effort to break the Arab hostility around us with power, connections, and resourcefulness. . . . It is our goal to reach an alliance with Ethiopia—cultural, economic, and military. We must spare no effort and resources in working toward this aim."

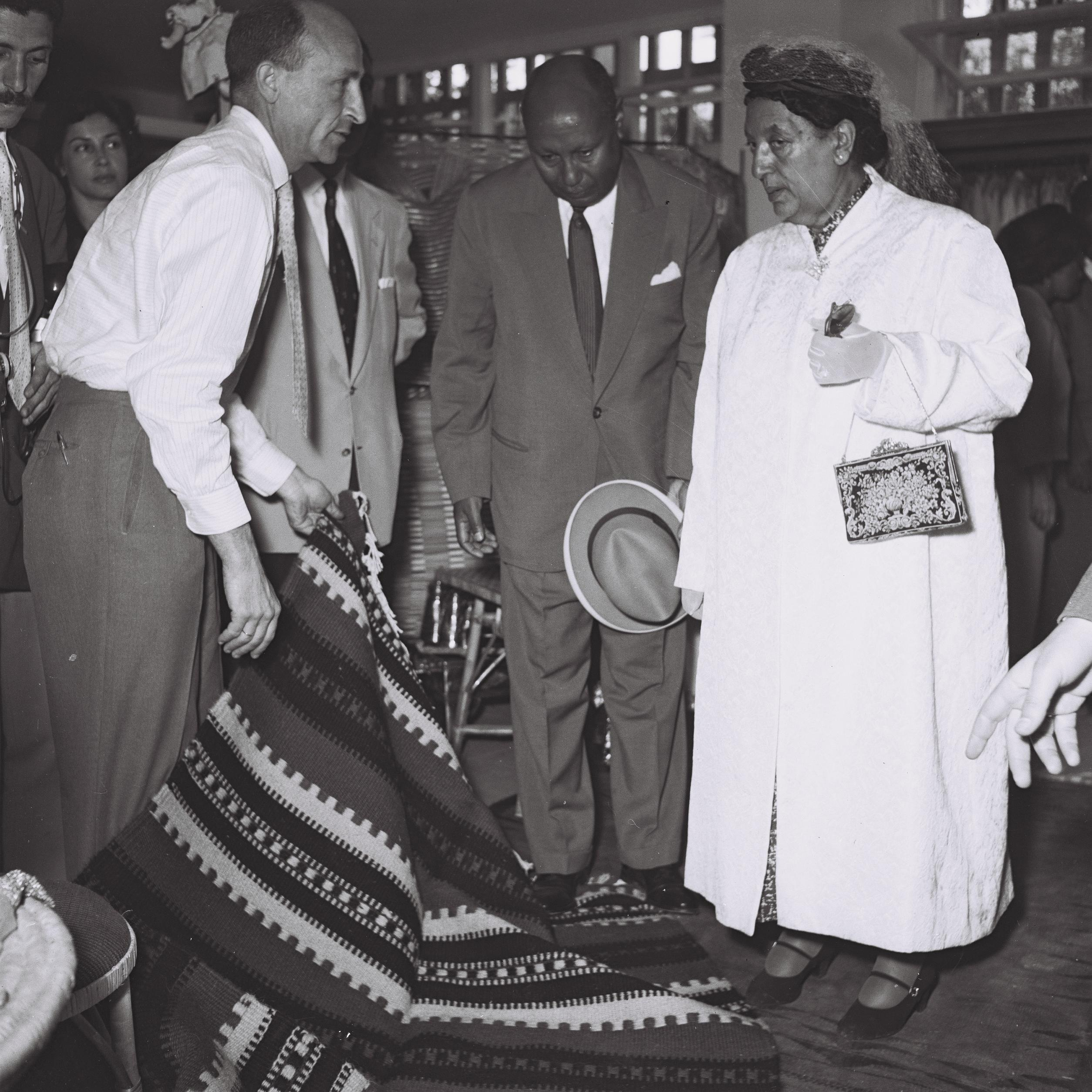
Empress Menen Asfaw visiting Israel, 1959

In the early 1960s, Israel started helping the Ethiopian government in its campaigns against the Eritrean Liberation Front (ELF). The Ethiopian government portrayed the Eritrean rebellion as an Arab threat to the African region, an argument that convinced the Israelis to side with the Ethiopian government in the conflict. Israel trained counter-insurgency forces and the Governor General of Eritrea, Asrate Medhin Kassa, had an Israeli Military Attaché as his advisor. An Israeli colonel was put in charge of a military training school at Decamare and the training of the Ethiopian Marine Commando Forces. By 1966, there were around 100 Israeli military advisors in Ethiopia. During 1960s, the Israelis had trained thousands of Ethiopian troops in counterinsurgency tactics.

The Ethiopian–Israeli cooperation had impacts on the discourse of the Eritrean rebel movements, which increasingly began to use anti-Zionist rhetoric. It also enabled the Eritreans to mobilize material support from the Arab and Islamic world. The Israeli perception of the war in Eritrea as part of the Arab–Israeli conflict was reinforced when reports of links between the ELF and Palestine Liberation Organization emerged after the Six-Day War.

The regime of Emperor Haile Selassie sought support from Israel in countering the Somali Republic and Somali insurgents fighting for the independence of the Ogaden, which had been annexed by the Ethiopia Empire decades earlier. During a meeting with Israeli Defense Minister Moshe Dayan, Haile Selassie asserted that the Somali nationalist aspiration for a Greater Somalia was driven by Nasserite agitation and went so far as to express hope that Somalia itself should be annexed by Ethiopia. High-ranking Israeli police officials helped establish special border police forces in the Ogaden. The Ethiopian government claimed the Palestinian Liberation Organization (PLO) was training the Somali guerrillas.

Parallel to the conflicts in Eritrea and Ogaden, Israel was also accused of aiding the Ethiopian government in crushing the Oromo resistance.

Although the United States primarily trained the Ethiopian Air Force during Emperor Haile Selassie's reign and supplied new F-5 jets in April 1966, the Ethiopians restructured their air force that same year based on an Israeli Defense Force military program provided by Tel Aviv.

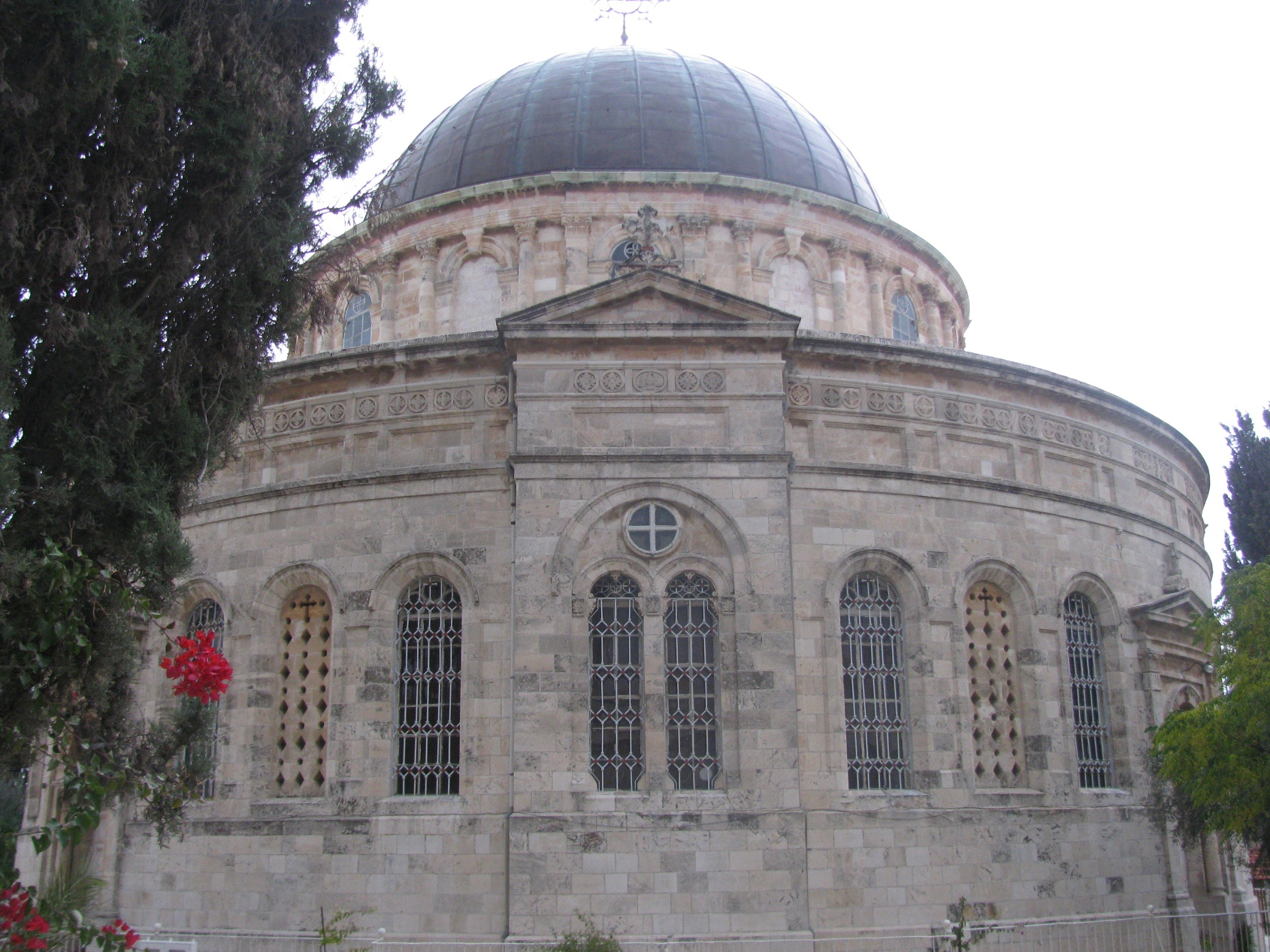
Ethiopian Church in Jerusalem

In 1969 the Israeli government had proposed the formation of an anti-Pan-Arab alliance consisting of the United States, Israel, Ethiopia, Iran and Turkey. Ethiopia rejected the proposal. In 1971, the Israeli Chief of Staff Bar Lev made a visit to Ethiopia, during which he presented proposals for deepening of Israeli-Ethiopian cooperation. The Ethiopians turned down the Israeli proposals but nevertheless, Ethiopia became internationally accused of having given concessions to Israel for setting up Israeli military bases on Ethiopian islands in the Red Sea. Ethiopia consistently denied all such accusations.

Israel offered Ethiopia military assistance in the event of a Yemeni take-over of the islands, but Ethiopia turned down the offer fearing a political backlash. Still, Ethiopia was attacked at the 1973 OAU summit in Addis Abeba by the Libyan delegation, accusing Ethiopia of allowing the build-up of Israeli bases on its territory. At the summit the Algerian president Houari Boumediène called on Ethiopia to break its relations with Israel. In return, Boumediène offered to use his political leverage to freeze Arab support for the ELF.

The allegations of possible Israeli military bases on the islands of the Eritrean coast surfaced again soon thereafter, at a summit of Foreign Ministers of Islamic countries, held in Benghazi, Libya. The Benghazi meeting condemned Ethiopian-Israeli cooperation, and pledged support for the ELF.

Ethiopian Prime Minister Aklilu Habte-Wold began seeking political support for breaking relations with Israel after the OAU summit. In early 1973, the Ethiopian foreign ministry sought to organize an imperial visit to Riyadh, which was intended to be reciprocated by King Faysal. Foreign Minister Ketema Yifru traveled to Saudi Arabia in April before continuing on to Egypt. Although President Sadat was in favor of a stable Ethiopia, he believed the country should sever ties with Israel. In Riyadh, Katama encountered similar sentiments, alongside promises of compensating Ethiopia for its losses through the import of meat and grain and collaboration on developing Red Sea resources. Despite Faysal’s travels to various African nations, he did not visit Ethiopia himself but instead sent missions to Aklilu emphasizing the need to expel Israeli presence. When questioned about why Ethiopia was particularly pressured to do this, the Saudis argued that Ethiopia held a unique position; it was strategically important and regarded as the spiritual capital of Africa. While Ethiopia had historically been significant to Islam, its ties with Israel were of particular concern to the Arab world, which deemed it crucial for those relations to end. In September, Haile Selassie and King Faysal finally met at the non-aligned countries conference held in Algeria. An Ethiopian source reported that during this conference, Faysal allegedly pledged a financial package worth $200 million in exchange for Ethiopia severing its ties with Israel. Part of this funding was intended for arms purchases, while the remainder was allocated for domestic needs. Additionally, Ethiopia faced a barrage of promises and threats from various Arab nations, both radical and moderate.

At the end of the October/Yom Kippur War, on October 23rd, Haile Selassie severed Ethiopia's ties to Israel. He made this move despite the advice of key figures such as Ras Asrate Kassa, Chief of Staff General Assefa Ayene, and the head priests led by Abuna Tewoflos, all of whom symbolized Ethiopia’s longstanding legacy of imperial Christian independence. In the wake of this decision, nearly 100 Israeli advisers, businessmen, and diplomats were left in shock, and within a week they departed, with Ambassador Aynor being the last to leave on November 3. Following this, King Faysal sent a cable to Haile Selassie congratulating him on eliminating “Zionism, which aims to control the world,” and reiterated his promise to provide compensation beyond their losses. However, in reality, little assistance was forthcoming from across the Red Sea. Faysal, for his part, did not address the previously $200 million aid package. Instead, he mentioned a modest amount of $35 million, with a significant portion earmarked for the construction of an Islamic center in Addis Ababa. He also indicated his willingness to assist Ethiopia with oil and arms purchases. According to a separate Ethiopian source close to the Emperor, the weary and aging monarch returned from Riyadh feeling overwhelmed. He retreated to his room and refrained from appearing in public for several days.

=== Mengistu rule ===
Even after Ethiopia broke diplomatic relations with Israel in 1973, Israeli military aid continued after the Derg military junta came to power and included spare parts and ammunition for U.S.-made weapons and service for U.S.-made F-5 jet fighters. Israel also maintained a small group of military advisers in Addis Ababa.

During the Ogaden War, Israeli Minister of Foreign Affairs Moshe Dayan publicly acknowledged that Israel had been providing security assistance and arms to Ethiopia to fight against Somalia. Israeli support began after Mengistu's government requested weapons, prompting Israel to consult with the United States before delivering arms via cargo planes. Several Arab states also accused Israel of direct involvement in the conflict. Mengistu Haile Mariam expelled all Israelis so that he might preserve his relationship with radical Arab states such as Libya and South Yemen. Mengistu had sought Israeli support during the war even though the Soviets and Cubans were uncomfortable with their presence in Ethiopia.

Although respectively Addis Ababa claimed it had terminated its military relationship with Israel, military cooperation continued. In 1983, for example, Israel provided communications training, and in 1984 Israeli advisers trained the Presidential Guard and Israeli technical personnel served with the police. Some Western observers believed that Israel provided military assistance to Ethiopia in exchange for Mengistu's tacit cooperation during Operation Moses in 1984, in which 10,000 Beta Israel (Ethiopian Jews) were evacuated to Israel. In 1985 Israel reportedly sold Addis Ababa at least US$20 million in Soviet-made munitions and spare parts captured in Lebanon. According to the Eritrean People's Liberation Front (EPLF), the Mengistu regime received US$83 million worth of Israeli military aid in 1987, and Israel deployed some 300 military advisers to Ethiopia. Additionally, the EPLF claimed that thirty-eight Ethiopian pilots had gone to Israel for training.

As Mengistu's allies in the Socialist Bloc went into a state of crisis and division, Ethiopia began to put more emphasis on relations with Israel. In 1989 formal diplomatic relations were reinstated. In late 1989, Israel reportedly finalized a secret agreement to provide increased military assistance in exchange for Mengistu's promise to allow Ethiopia's remaining Beta Israel to immigrate to Israel. In addition, the two nations agreed to restore diplomatic relations and increase intelligence cooperation. Mengistu apparently believed that Israel, unlike the Soviet Union, whose military advisers emphasized conventional tactics, could provide the training and matériel needed to transform the Ethiopian army into a counterinsurgency force.

During the 1990s, Israeli-Ethiopian relations grew stronger. According to the New York Times, Israel supplied 150,000 rifles, cluster bombs, ten to twenty military advisers to train Mengistu's Presidential Guard, and an unknown number of instructors to work with Ethiopian commando units. Unconfirmed reports also suggested that Israel had provided the Ethiopian Air Force with surveillance cameras and had agreed to train Ethiopian pilots.

=== 21st century ===
In 2012, an Ethiopian-born Israeli, Belaynesh Zevadia, was appointed Israeli ambassador to Ethiopia. Ethiopian Prime Minister Abiy Ahmed and Israeli Prime Minister Benjamin Netanyahu that same year have been said to "enjoy a warm personal relationship" by The Times of Israel.

== Commercial relations ==
Trade relations between Ethiopia and Israel have grown over the years. In the early 1980s, Dafron, an Israeli notebook manufacturer, won a government contract to market 2 million notebooks to Ethiopia. Israel imports Ethiopian sesame, coffee, grains, skins and hides, spices, oilseed and natural gum.

== Israeli arm sales to Ethiopia ==
Israel has provided air defense systems to protect strategic points in Ethiopia and sold assault rifles to the Ethiopian National Defense Forces.

== Ethiopian Jews ==
In return for this aid, Ethiopia permitted the emigration of the Beta Israel. Departures in the spring reached about 500 people a month before Ethiopian officials adopted new emigration procedures that reduced the figure by more than two-thirds. The following year, Jerusalem and Addis Ababa negotiated another agreement whereby Israel provided agricultural, economic, and health assistance. Also, in May 1991, as the Mengistu regime neared its end, Israel paid US$35 million in cash to allow nearly 15,000 Beta Israel to emigrate from Ethiopia to Israel.

== See also ==
- Operation Solomon
- Alliance of the periphery
- International recognition of Israel
