= Dawson Airport =

Dawson Airport may refer to:

- Dawson City Airport (IATA: YDA) near Dawson City, Yukon, Canada
- Dawson Community Airport (IATA: GDV) near Glendive, Dawson County, Montana, United States
- Dawson Field, near Zarqa, Zara Governorate, Jordan
