= Bar-Lev =

Bar-Lev (Hebrew: בר-לב) is a Hebrew surname which means "son (of) heart" and "pure heart" (Psalm 24:4), and may refer to:

- Amir Bar-Lev (born 1974), American film director
- Haim Bar-Lev (1924–1994), Israeli politician- born Haim Brotzlewsky
- Omer Bar-Lev (born 1953), Israeli politician, son of Haim
- Uri Bar-Lev (born 1931), Israeli pilot who thwarted the hijacking of El Al Flight 219 in 1970
- Bar Lev Line
- Bar-Lev (game), a board wargame published in 1974 by Conflict Games
