= Patrick Argüello =

Nicaraguan-American hijacker (1943–1970)

Patricio José Argüello Ryan
- Born: March 30, 1943; San Francisco, California, United States
- Died: September 6, 1970 (aged 27); London, England, United Kingdom
- Education: UCLA
- Years active: 1960s–1970
- Employer: Popular Front for the Liberation of Palestine
- Known for: Failed hijacking of Israel's El Al Flight 219 in September 1970
- Political party: Sandinista National Liberation Front
- Children: 3 (alleged by Leila Khaled)

Patricio José Argüello Ryan (March 30, 1943 – September 6, 1970), commonly referred to simply as Patrick Argüello, was a Nicaraguan-American Marxist–Leninist militant. He was a member of the Sandinista National Liberation Front (FSLN), and is best-known for his unsuccessful hijacking of El Al Flight 219 alongside Palestinian militant Leila Khaled on September 6, 1970. Flight 219 was an international civilian passenger flight from Tel Aviv to New York City that was hijacked by the duo shortly after it took off from a stopover in Amsterdam. Argüello and Khaled, acting on part of a larger series of hijackings by the Popular Front for the Liberation of Palestine (PFLP), ultimately failed to take control of the plane due to heavy resistance from the passengers and security, who subdued the duo after pilot Uri Bar-Lev had thrown them off balance by putting the plane into a steep nosedive. Bar-Lev then made an emergency landing at Heathrow Airport in London, where Argüello was shot multiple times, later succumbing to his injuries. The FSLN had agreed to support the PFLP's hijackings in exchange for guerilla warfare training.

== Early life ==
Argüello was born in San Francisco, California, in March 1943; his father was Nicaraguan national Rodolfo Argüello Ruiz and his mother was Irish-American citizen Kathleen Ryan. His family moved to Nicaragua when he was three years old, moving between the cities of León, La Paz Centro, and Managua. In 1956, after Nicaraguan dictator Anastasio Somoza García was assassinated, his surviving sons Luis and Anastasio launched a nationwide crackdown. Argüello's family was part of an exodus of affluent Nicaraguans, fleeing the country for the United States, where they settled down in Los Angeles.

In Los Angeles, Argüello attended Belmont Senior High School. As he grew older, he became increasingly resentful of the Somoza regime. Like many youths throughout Latin America in the 1960s, he was fascinated by the Cuban Revolution and by the figure of Argentine communist revolutionary Che Guevara. In the years following high school, he saw many of his friends in the student movement beaten, arrested, or killed.

== Education and political career ==
Graduating from UCLA, Argüello received a Fulbright scholarship to study medicine in Chile in 1967. This was during the time of political ferment that would culminate in the victory of socialist politician Salvador Allende in the 1970 Chilean presidential election; Argüello was deeply affected by the deaths of several Nicaraguan friends who were members of the Sandinista National Liberation Front (FSLN) in August 1967, as well as by Che Guevara's death in Bolivia two months later.

When he returned to Nicaragua, he attempted to collaborate with the FSLN. However, the party's founder Carlos Fonseca distrusted Argüello due to his American background. As he suspected Argüello of being an infiltrator, he limited his participation in the organization. Argüello was exiled by the Somoza government in August 1969 for his anti-regime activities. He then went to Geneva, Switzerland, to work with other exiled Nicaraguans.

In early 1970, FSLN leader Oscar Turcios made contact with the European communist organization Fourth International, in the hopes of meeting other guerrilla groups who could offer much-needed military training to the FSLN's fledgling movement. The FSLN's first such connection was with the Democratic Front for the Liberation of Palestine (DFLP); Argüello and several other FSLN members were sent to DFLP camps near Amman, Jordan, to receive guerrilla training from April to June 1970. Two other Nicaraguans who trained with Argüello were Juan José Quezada (killed in Nicaragua in 1973) and Pedro Aráuz Palacios (killed in Nicaragua in 1977).

Palestinian militant Leila Khaled, in her personal memoirs, alleges that Argüello fathered three children. However, in a biographical study of Argüello, American biographer Marshall Yurow found no evidence to substantiate this claim.

In the summer of 1970, Argüello and a small group of Nicaraguan FSLN émigrés made contact with a different faction of the Palestinian guerrilla movement: the Popular Front for the Liberation of Palestine (PFLP). The Nicaraguans wanted additional guerrilla training, which the PFLP agreed to provide in exchange for the FSLN's participation in the Dawson's Field hijackings.

== Hijacking of Israel's El Al Flight 219 ==
When two other Palestinian co-conspirators were unable to board the targeted El Al Flight 219 at the stopover in Amsterdam on September 6, 1970, Argüello was left with Palestinian militant Leila Khaled, whom he knew only as "Shadiah" after having met her a week earlier. Posing as husband and wife, they boarded the plane using Honduran passports — having passed through a security check of their luggage — and were seated in the second row of economy class. Just before they began their hijacking, Khaled informed Argüello of her actual identity, which impressed him. Half an hour after takeoff, they drew their guns and approached the cockpit, demanding entrance.

The well-dressed Argüello reportedly threw his sole grenade down the airliner aisle, but it failed to explode. He then drew his pistol, after which a passenger attacked him by hitting him over the head with a bottle of whiskey. Pilot Uri Bar-Lev, upon learning of the hijacking in progress, refused to concede to Khaled's demands to open the cockpit door and instead threw the plane into a steep nosedive to throw them off balance. Argüello fired his gun three or five times, wounding steward Shlomo Vider.

Khaled was also unsuccessful; she had concealed her grenades within her brassiere, but was unable to reach them in time and ended up being beaten by the passengers and security guards. As the flight's occupants subdued Argüello and Khaled, Bar-Lev made an emergency landing at the Heathrow Airport in London.

According to the passengers and sky marshals, Argüello was shot four times during this struggle, and later succumbed to his wounds; he was dead by the time he and Khaled had been loaded into an ambulance to Hillingdon Hospital, possibly before they left the plane. Bar-Lev refused orders from El Al to return to Israel due to his concern for the wounded Vider. Argüello's accomplice Khaled, who survived the incident, has at various times claimed that he was shot after they both failed to successfully hijack the plane.

== Legacy ==
In 1972, the Japanese Red Army and the Popular Front for the Liberation of Palestine (PFLP) killed 26 people and wounded more than 80 in the Lod Airport massacre. The letter claiming responsibility for the attack, which the PFLP had dubbed "Operation Dir Yassin" against Israel, explained that it had been carried by Squad of the Martyr Patrick Argüello — though Argüello had been killed two years earlier in the failed hijacking.

In the late 1970s, a small book publisher in San Francisco, California, named itself the Patrick Argüello Press/People's Information Relay. It was noted chiefly for publishing Minimanual of the Urban Guerrilla and Red Army Faction. American authorities arrested the publisher's editors on unrelated charges, following which the company was dissolved.

In 1983, after the Nicaraguan Revolution, the Sandinista National Liberation Front commemorated Argüello by renaming the geothermal plant at Momotombo in his honor. However, after the 9/11 attacks against the United States, the Nicaraguan government of Arnoldo Alemán removed the name of the plant, claiming it was wrong to honor a terrorist.

The 1990s British musical group Baader Meinhof wrote a song entitled "Kill Ramirez" with the verse: "Patrick Argüello, Leila Khaled/disappeared into the tail end of the plane/said he's not one/of the brothers/good days bad days/they're all the same/Kill Ramirez el pirata"; the publisher Luke Haines used a pseudonym for the album.

== Quotes ==
Palestinian militant Leila Khaled spoke of Argüello often after the hijacking, stating: "Our rendezvous with history was approaching: all plans had to be translated into action; history was ours to write; Patrick Argüello was to write it in blood, I was not so honoured."

Palestinian author Ghassan Kanafani later spoke of Argüello, stating: "The martyr Patrick Argüello is a symbol for a just cause and the struggle to achieve it, a struggle without limits. He is a symbol for the oppressed and deprived masses, represented by Oum Saad and many others coming from the camps and from all parts of Lebanon, who marched in his funeral procession."
