= Amina Dahbour =

- أمينة دحبور
- Born: 1945 (age 80–81); Kafr 'Ana, Mandatory Palestine
- Known for: El Al Flight 432 attack
- Political party: Popular Front for the Liberation of Palestine
- Criminal charges: Murder, violation of Swiss sovereignty
- Criminal penalty: 12 years imprisonment
- Criminal status: Released

Amina Dahbour (Arabic: أمينة دحبور; born 1945) is a Palestinian militant of the Popular Front for the Liberation of Palestine (PFLP), known for her role in the El Al Flight 432 attack.

== Biography ==
Amina Dahbour was born in 1945, in the Palestinian town of Kafr 'Ana. She was in the Gaza Strip when it was first occupied by Israel in 1956. She became a teacher at a UNRWA school, where she educated Palestinian refugee children until June 1967, when the Gaza Strip was militarily occupied by Israel a second time following the Six-Day War. She subsequently left Gaza and joined the nascent Popular Front for the Liberation of Palestine (PFLP). In February 1969, she participated in the El Al Flight 432 attack in Switzerland, following which she was arrested and imprisoned by Swiss authorities.

Dahbour and her accomplices, Mohamed Abu el Heiga and Yousef Ibrahim Tawifk, were charged with murder and the violation of Swiss sovereignty. In November 1969, they were tried in a court in Kloten, in the first legal proceeding to take place for a terrorist attack against air transportation. Dahbour and her co-defendants framed the attack as a military operation in the context of the ongoing Israeli–Palestinian conflict and recounted their experiences as refugees following the Israeli occupations of Palestinian lands. On 22 December 1969, the three were found guilty and each sentenced to twelve years in prison. Following the Dawson's Field hijackings by the PFLP, which demanded the release of Palestinian prisoners, the three were released and transported to Cairo.

She has been listed alongside Shadia Abu Ghazaleh, Leila Khalid and Fatima Bernawi as a prominent example of women's participation in the Palestinian militant movement.
