= Uri Bar-Lev =

Israeli airline pilot (born 1931)

Uri Bar-Lev (Hebrew: אורי בר-לב; born July 16, 1931) is a retired Israeli airline pilot. He has been claimed to be the only pilot to have successfully thwarted an in-flight hijacking. Bar-Lev was born on a moshav in what is now Israel. As a teenager, he served as a soldier during the 1948 Arab–Israeli War and later became a pilot in the Israeli Air Force. His last military flight was in the 1956 Sinai War, after which he became a pilot for Israel's national airline El Al.

== El Al Flight 219 ==
On September 6, 1970, Bar-Lev was the pilot of El Al Flight 219 from Tel Aviv to New York via Amsterdam. He was made aware that four suspicious people were trying to board the plane. Bar-Lev insisted that two of the suspects not be allowed to board, and the two others be questioned. He also asked that the air-marshal be seated with him in the cockpit during the flight. Once the hijackers, Patrick Argüello and Leila Khaled, threatened the crew and passengers, Bar-Lev took control of the flight and threw the plane into a dive. This lowered the plane's altitude making any explosion or damage less dangerous and knocked the hijackers to the ground. The air marshal killed Argüello and Khaled was arrested after passing out as a result of the dramatic shift in air pressure.

Flight 219 was the fifth flight hijacked in that one week of September 1970.

Israeli air command told Bar-Lev to fly the plane to Tel Aviv, but he was concerned for the welfare of an injured flight attendant, and the two air marshals, and instead brought the plane to London. Bar-Lev and the crew were detained for hours, questioned by the British police. He was later sanctioned for this decision as well as the decision to have the air marshal fly in the cockpit with him.

Bar-Lev and the crew were celebrated by the Conference of Presidents of Major American Jewish Organizations in December 1970.

== Retirement and later life ==
In 1974, Bar-Lev retired as a pilot. He lives in Israel with his wife, Yona.

Bar-Lev was instrumental in cancelling a 2020 San Francisco State University event with Leila Khaled, one of the 1970 hijackers, arguing that it crossed a line between free speech and inciting terrorism.
