= Honduran passport =

Passport issued to citizens of Honduras

Honduran passport; Pasaporte hondureño
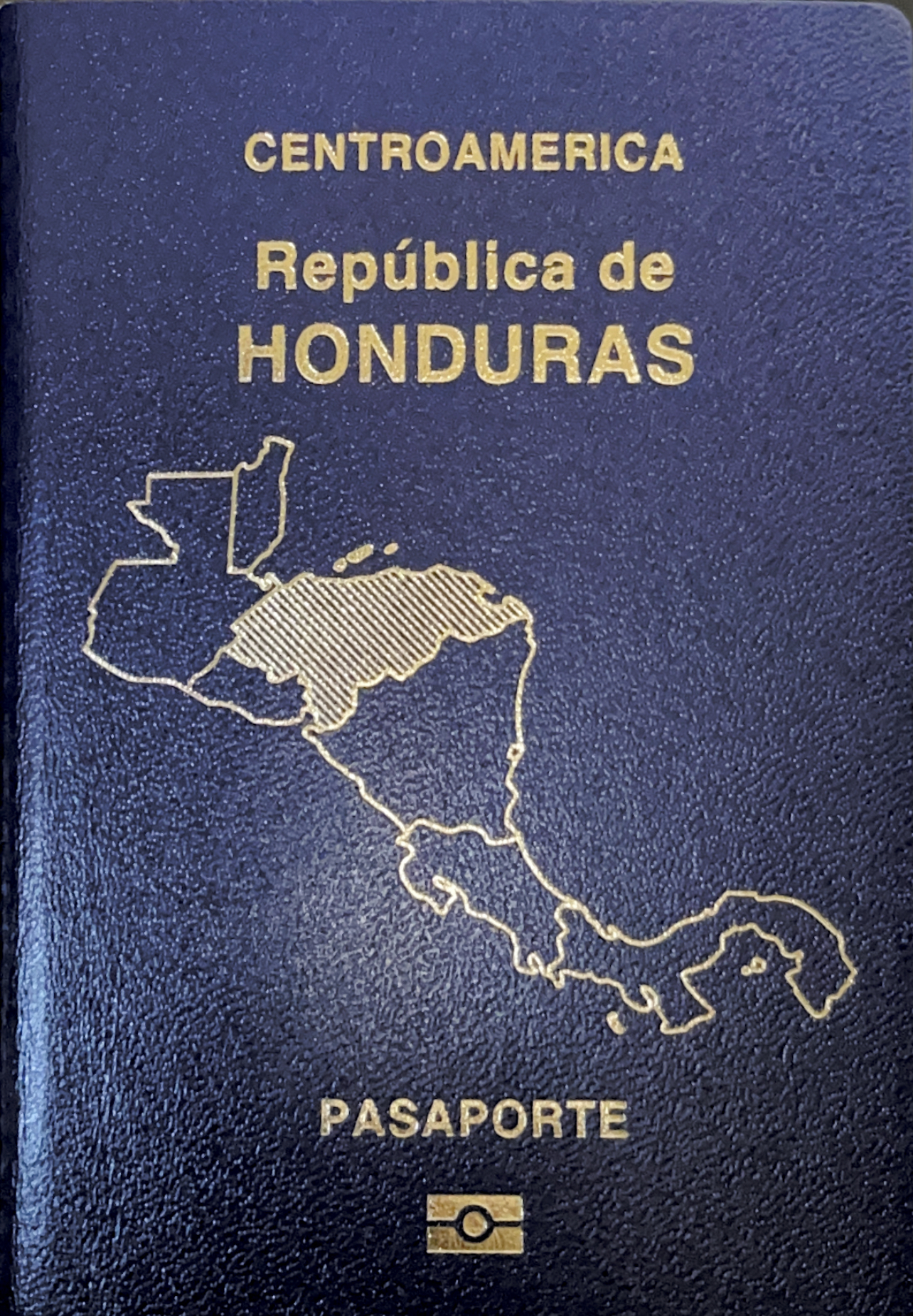
- Honduran passport front cover with chip
- Type: Passport
- Issued by: Honduras
- First issued: March 2022 (e-passport)
- Purpose: Identification
- Eligibility: Honduran citizenship

Honduran passports (Spanish: Pasaporte hondureño) are travel documents issued to Honduran citizens to travel outside Honduras.

As of 2024, Honduran citizens had visa-free or visa-on-arrival access to 133 countries and territories, ranking the Honduran passport 38th in terms of travel freedom (tied with Dominica and El Salvador) according to the Henley visa restrictions index.

In 2019, plans were confirmed gradually to begin issuing biometric passports to Honduran citizens beginning in the period between late 2019 and early 2020.

Honduras transitioned to a biometric passport in 2022.

== See also ==
- Central America-4 passport
- Visa requirements for Honduran citizens
- Visa policy of Honduras
