= Visa requirements for Honduran citizens =

Administrative entry restrictions

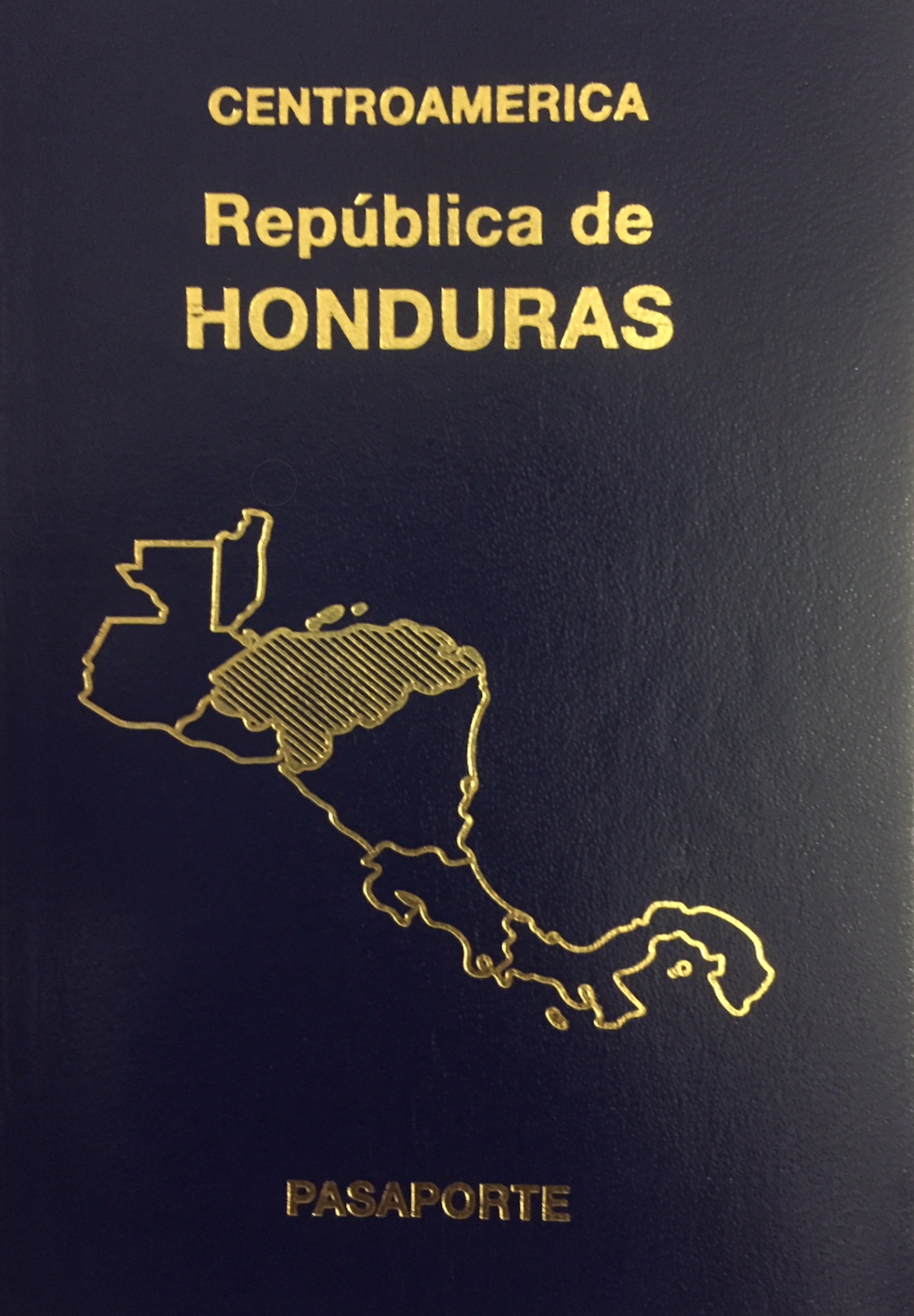
Front cover of a Honduran passport

Visa requirements for Honduran citizens are administrative entry restrictions by the authorities of other states placed on citizens of Honduras. As of 2026, Honduran citizens have visa-free or visa on arrival access to 129 countries and territories, ranking the Honduran passport 35th in terms of travel freedom according to the Henley Passport Index.

== Visa requirements map ==
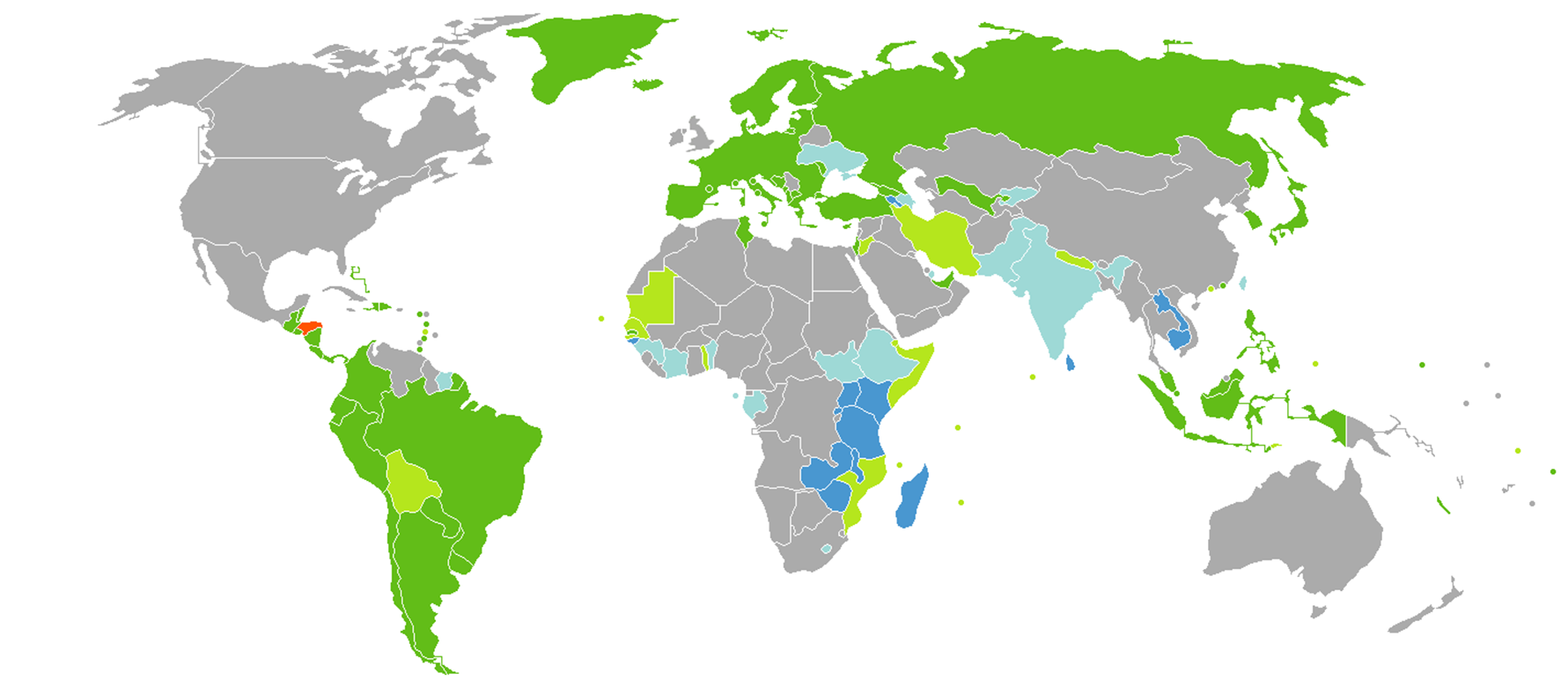
Visa requirements for Honduran citizens Honduras Visa free access Visa on arrival Visa on arrival or eVisa eVisa Visa required

== Visa requirements ==
Visa requirements for holders of normal passports traveling for tourist purposes:

Country	Visa requirement	Allowed stay	Notes (excluding departure fees)
Afghanistan	eVisa	30 days	Visa is not required in case born in Afghanistan or can proof that one of their parents is a national of Afghanistan or born in Afghanistan.; e-Visa : Visitors must arrive at Kabul International (KBL).
Albania	Visa not required	90 days	
Algeria	Visa required		
Andorra	Visa not required		
Angola	eVisa		
Antigua and Barbuda	eVisa		
Argentina	Visa not required	3 months	
Armenia	eVisa / Visa on arrival	120 days	
Australia	Visa required		May apply online (Online Visitor e600 visa).
Austria	Visa not required	90 days	90 days within any 180 day period in the Schengen Area
Azerbaijan	eVisa	30 days	
Bahamas	Visa not required	3 months	
Bahrain	eVisa	Up to 3 Months	
Bangladesh	Visa required		
Barbados	Visa not required	90 days	
Belarus	Visa required		Visa-free for up to 10 days in Brest and Grodno visa-free areas, see Visa policy of Belarus.; Visas are issued on arrival at the Minsk International Airport if the support documents were submitted not later than 3 business days before expected date of arrival.
Belgium	Visa not required	90 days	90 days within any 180 day period in the Schengen Area
Belize	Visa not required	30 days	
Benin	eVisa / Visa on arrival	30 days / 8 days	Must have an international vaccination certificate.
Bhutan	eVisa		Visa fee is USD 40 per person and visa application may be processed within 5 business days with duration of stay of 90 days.; e-Visa applicant is also subject to pay Sustainable Development Fee
Bolivia	Visa not required	90 days	
Bosnia and Herzegovina	Visa not required	90 days	90 days within any 6-month period
Botswana	Visa required		
Brazil	Visa not required	90 days	
Brunei	Visa required		
Bulgaria	Visa not required	90 days	90 days within any 180 day period
Burkina Faso	Visa required		
Burundi	Visa on arrival		
Cambodia	eVisa / Visa on arrival	30 days	Visa is also obtainable online.
Cameroon	eVisa		
Canada	Visa required		
Cape Verde	Visa on arrival		Not available at all entry points.
Central African Republic	Visa required		
Chad	Visa required		
Chile	Visa not required	90 days	
China	Visa required		
Colombia	Visa not required	180 days	90 days - extendable up to 180-days stay within a one-year period
Comoros	Visa on arrival		
Republic of the Congo	Visa required		
Democratic Republic of the Congo	Visa required		
Costa Rica	Visa not required	90 days	Oct. 24, Honduras citizens are Visa-free, penal antecedent with 6 months of validation is required to enter the country
Côte d'Ivoire	Visa required		
Croatia	Visa not required	90 days	90 days within any 180 day period in the Schengen Area
Cuba	eVisa	90 days	
Cyprus	Visa not required	90 days	90 days within any 180 day period
Czech Republic	Visa not required	90 days	90 days within any 180 day period in the Schengen Area
Denmark	Visa not required	90 days	90 days within any 180 day period in the Schengen Area
Djibouti	eVisa	31 days	
Dominica	Visa not required	6 months	
Dominican Republic	Visa not required	90 days	
Ecuador	Visa not required	90 days	
Egypt	Visa on arrival	30 days	
El Salvador	Visa not required	3 months	ID Card Valid
Equatorial Guinea	eVisa		must arrive via Malabo International Airport, processing fee 75 USD
Eritrea	Visa required		
Estonia	Visa not required	90 days	90 days within any 180 day period in the Schengen Area
Eswatini	Visa required		
Ethiopia	eVisa	up to 90 days	eVisa holders must arrive via Addis Ababa Bole International Airport
Fiji	Visa required		
Finland	Visa not required	90 days	90 days within any 180 day period in the Schengen Area
France and territories	Visa not required	90 days	90 days within any 180 day period in the Schengen Area
Gabon	eVisa		Electronic visa holders must arrive via Libreville International Airport.
Gambia	Visa required		
Georgia	Visa not required	1 year	
Germany	Visa not required	90 days	90 days within any 180 day period in the Schengen Area
Ghana	Visa required		
Greece	Visa not required	90 days	90 days within any 180 day period in the Schengen Area
Grenada	Visa required		
Guatemala	Visa not required	90 days	ID Card Valid
Guinea	eVisa	up to 90 days	
Guinea-Bissau	eVisa / Visa on arrival	90 days	
Guyana	Visa required		
Haiti	Visa not required	3 months	
Hungary	Visa not required	90 days	90 days within any 180 day period in the Schengen Area
Iceland	Visa not required	90 days	90 days within any 180 day period in the Schengen Area
India	e-Visa	60 days	e-Visa holders must arrive via 32 designated airports (Note: Ahmedabad; Amritsar; Bagdogra; Bengaluru; Bhubaneswar; Chandigarh; Chennai; Coimbatore; Delhi; Gaya; Goa-Dabolim; Goa-Manohar; Guwahati; Hyderabad; Indore; Jaipur; Kannur; Kochi; Kolkata; Kozhikode; Lucknow; Madurai; Mangaluru; Mumbai; Nagpur; Port Blair; Pune; Surat; Thiruvananthapuram; Tiruchirappalli; Varanasi; Visakhapatnam) or 5 designated seaports. (Note: Chennai; Cochin; Mormugao (Goa); Mumbai; Mangalore); An Indian e-Tourist Visa may only be obtained twice within 1 calendar year.; Foreigners of Pakistani origin or who hold a Pakistani Passport are not eligible for an e-Visa. Foreigners who are not Pakistani nationals, but whose parents or grandparents (either paternal or maternal) were born in, or were permanent residents in Pakistan, are also not eligible for an e-Visa.
Indonesia	Visa required		
Iran	eVisa	30 days	
Iraq	Visa required		
Ireland	Visa required		
Israel	ETA-IL	90 days	
Italy	Visa not required	90 days	90 days within any 180 day period in the Schengen Area
Jamaica	Visa required		
Japan	Visa not required	90 days	
Jordan	Visa on arrival	30 days	Conditions apply.; Not available at all entry points.
Kazakhstan	eVisa		
Kenya	eVisa	3 months	
Kiribati	Visa not required	90 days	90 days within any 12 month period
North Korea	Visa required		
South Korea	Korean Electronic Travel Authorization	30 days	
Kuwait	Visa required		
Kyrgyzstan	eVisa		Electronic visa holders must arrive via Manas International Airport or Osh Airport or through land crossings with China (at Irkeshtam and Torugart), Kazakhstan (at Ak-jol, Ak-Tilek, Chaldybar, Chon-Kapka), Tajikistan (at Bor-Dobo, Kulundu, Kyzyl-Bel) and Uzbekistan (at Dostuk).
Laos	eVisa / Visa on arrival	30 days	18 (Note: Savannakhet Airport; Lanetoui - Mengkang (China); Meuangmom - Wan Pong (Myanmar); Banvang - Ban Khok Phai (Thailand); Namngeun - Huay Kon (Thailand); Paksan - Bueng Kan (Thailand); Paktaphan - Pak Saeng (Thailand); Pangmon - Ban Huak (Thailand); Phoudou (Thailand); Dak ta ock - Nam Giang (Vietnam); La Lai (Vietnam); Namkan (Vietnam); Namphao - Cau Treo (Vietnam); Namsoy - Na Meo (Vietnam); Naphao - Cha Lo (Vietnam); Pahang - Long Sap (Vietnam); Panghok - Tây Trang (Vietnam); Phoukeua - Bo Y (Vietnam)) of the 33 border crossings are only open to regular visa holders.; e-Visa may be used to enter Laos through the Luang Prabang, Pakse and Vientiane international airports, 3 Thai-Lao Friendship Bridges (Note: Vientiane (Friendship Bridge 1); Savannakhet (Friendship Bridge 2); Bokeo (Friendship Bridge 4)), in Boten (road and railroad), and in Vientiane (at Khamsavath railway station).; Visa on arrival is available at the Luang Prabang, Pakse and Vientiane international airports, 4 Thai-Lao Friendship Bridges (Note: Vientiane (Friendship Bridge 1); Savannakhet (Friendship Bridge 2); Khammouane (Friendship Bridge 3); Bokeo (Friendship Bridge 4)) and 7 border crossings. (Note: Nongnokkheane - Trapeang Kriel (Cambodia); Boten - Bo han (China); Golden Triangle/Samliemkham (Thailand); Khamsavath railway station (Thailand); Namheuang - Ban Na Kraseng (Thailand); Vang tao - Chongmek (Thailand); Dansavan - Lao Bảo (Vietnam))
Latvia	Visa not required	90 days	90 days within any 180 day period in the Schengen Area
Lebanon	Visa required		
Lesotho	eVisa		
Liberia	Visa required		
Libya	Visa required		
Liechtenstein	Visa not required	90 days	90 days within any 180 day period in the Schengen Area
Lithuania	Visa not required	90 days	90 days within any 180 day period in the Schengen Area
Luxembourg	Visa not required	90 days	90 days within any 180 day period in the Schengen Area
Madagascar	eVisa / Visa on arrival	90 days	
Malawi	Visa on arrival	30 days	
Malaysia	Visa not required	30 days	
Maldives	Free visa on arrival	30 days	
Mali	Visa required		
Malta	Visa not required	90 days	90 days within any 180 day period in the Schengen Area
Marshall Islands	Visa on arrival	90 days	
Mauritania	Visa on arrival		Available at Nouakchott–Oumtounsy International Airport.
Mauritius	Visa on arrival	60 days	
Mexico	Visa required		Honduran citizens with a valid US Visa or a Visa from the European Union do not require a visa for 180 days to enter Mexico.
Micronesia	Visa not required	30 days	
Moldova	Visa not required	90 days	90 days within any 180 day period
Monaco	Visa not required		
Mongolia	eVisa	30 days	
Montenegro	Visa not required	90 days	
Morocco	e-Visa	30 days	e-Visa can be obtained online visit site: www.acces-maroc.ma/#/e-visa
Mozambique	Visa on arrival	30 days	Conditions apply
Myanmar	Visa required		
Namibia	Visa required		
Nauru	Visa required		
Nepal	Visa on arrival	90 days	
Netherlands	Visa not required	90 days	90 days within any 180 day period in the Schengen Area
New Zealand	Visa required		Holders of an Australian Permanent Resident Visa or Resident Return Visa may be granted a New Zealand Resident Visa on arrival permitting indefinite stay (pursuant to the Trans-Tasman Travel Arrangement), subject to meeting character requirements and obtaining an Electronic Travel Authority prior to departure.
Nicaragua	Visa not required	3 months	ID Card Valid
Niger	Visa required		
Nigeria	Visa required		
North Macedonia	Visa not required	90 days	
Norway	Visa not required	90 days	90 days within any 180 day period in the Schengen Area
Oman	Visa not required	14 days	30 days e-visa also available
Pakistan	Online Visa		Online Visa eligible.; Electronic Travel Authorization to obtain a visa on arrival for business purposes.
Palau	Free visa on arrival	30 days	
Panama	Visa not required	180 days	
Papua New Guinea	Visa required		
Paraguay	Visa not required	90 days	
Peru	Visa not required	90 days	90 days within 365 days period
Philippines	Visa not required	30 days	
Poland	Visa not required	90 days	90 days within any 180 day period in the Schengen Area
Portugal	Visa not required	90 days	90 days within any 180 day period in the Schengen Area
Qatar	eVisa	30 days	Visa is also obtainable online.
Romania	Visa not required	90 days	90 days within any 180 day period
Russia	Visa not required	90 days	90 days within any 180 day period
Rwanda	eVisa / Visa on arrival	30 days	
Saint Kitts and Nevis	Visa not required	3 months	
Saint Lucia	Visa on arrival	6 weeks	
Saint Vincent and the Grenadines	Visa not required	3 months	
Samoa	Visa not required	60 days	
San Marino	Visa not required		
São Tomé and Príncipe	eVisa		
Saudi Arabia	Visa required		
Senegal	Visa on arrival	90 days	
Serbia	Visa required		holders of valid visa or residents of the Cyprus, Ireland, Schengen Area member states, United Kingdom or the United States may enter Serbia without a visa for a maximum stay of 90 days within any 180-day period
Seychelles	Seychelles Electronic Border System	3 months	
Sierra Leone	Visa required		
Singapore	Visa not required	30 days	
Slovakia	Visa not required	90 days	90 days within any 180 day period in the Schengen Area
Slovenia	Visa not required	90 days	90 days within any 180 day period in the Schengen Area
Solomon Islands	Visa required		
Somalia	Visa on arrival	30 days	Available at Bosaso Airport, Galcaio Airport and Mogadishu Airport.
South Africa	Visa required		
South Sudan	Electronic Visa		Obtainable online; Printed visa authorization must be presented at the time of travel
Spain	Visa not required	90 days	90 days within any 180 day period in the Schengen Area
Sri Lanka	eVisa / Visa on arrival	30 days	
Sudan	Visa required		
Suriname	E-tourist card	90 days	Multiple entry eVisa is also available.
Sweden	Visa not required	90 days	90 days within any 180 day period in the Schengen Area
Switzerland	Visa not required	90 days	90 days within any 180 day period in the Schengen Area
Syria	Visa required		
Tajikistan	eVisa		
Tanzania	eVisa / Visa on arrival	3 months	
Thailand	Visa required		
Timor-Leste	Visa on arrival	30 days	Not available at all entry points.
Togo	Visa on arrival	7 days	
Tonga	Visa required		
Trinidad and Tobago	Visa not required	90 days	
Tunisia	Visa not required	90 days	
Turkey	Visa not required	3 months	
Turkmenistan	Visa required		
Tuvalu	Visa on arrival	1 month	
Uganda	eVisa / Visa on arrival		Determined at the port of entry. May apply online.
Ukraine	Visa required		e-Visa is currently suspended due to Russian invasion of Ukraine.
United Arab Emirates	Visa not required	90 days	90 days within any 180-days period
United Kingdom	Visa required		Visa required since 19 July 2023.
United States	Visa required		
Uruguay	Visa not required	90 days	
Uzbekistan	Visa not required	30 days	
Vanuatu	Visa required		
Vatican City	Visa not required		
Venezuela	Visa required		
Vietnam	eVisa	90 days	Phú Quốc without a visa for up to 30 days.
Yemen	Visa required		
Zambia	eVisa / Visa on arrival	90 days	
Zimbabwe	eVisa / Visa on arrival	30 days	

== Dependent, Disputed, or Restricted territories ==
Unrecognized or partially recognized countries

Territory	Conditions of access	Notes
Abkhazia	Visa required	
Kosovo	Visa not required	90 days
Northern Cyprus	Visa not required	
Palestine	Visa not required	Arrival by sea to Gaza Strip not allowed.
Sahrawi Arab Democratic Republic		Undefined visa regime in the Western Sahara controlled territory.
Somaliland	Visa on arrival	30 days for 30 US dollars, payable on arrival.
South Ossetia	Visa not required	
Taiwan	Visa not required	90 days; Holders of Honduran passport with "place of birth" recorded on the passport data page as the People's Republic of China are ineligible for the visa exemption.
Transnistria	Visa not required	Registration required after 24h.

Dependent and autonomous territories

Territory	Conditions of access	Notes
China
Hong Kong	Visa not required	30 days
Macau	Visa on arrival	30 days
Denmark
Faroe Islands	Visa not required	
Greenland	Visa not required	
France
Clipperton Island	Special permit required	
French Guiana	Visa not required	3 months
French Polynesia	Visa not required	3 months
Guadeloupe	Visa not required	
Martinique	Visa not required	
Saint Barthélemy	Visa not required	
Saint Martin	Visa not required	
Mayotte	Visa not required	3 months
New Caledonia	Visa not required	3 months
Réunion	Visa not required	3 months
Saint Pierre and Miquelon	Visa not required	3 months
Wallis and Futuna	Visa not required	
Netherlands
Aruba	Visa not required	90 days
Bonaire	Visa not required	
Sint Eustatius	Visa not required	
Saba	Visa not required	
Curaçao	Visa not required	90 days
Sint Maarten	Visa not	90 days
New Zealand
Cook Islands	Visa not required	31 days
Niue	Visa not required	30 days
Tokelau	Permit required	
Norway
(Norway) Jan Mayen	Permit required	Permit issued by the local police required for staying for less than 24 hours and permit issued by the Norwegian police for staying for more than 24 hours.
(Norway) Svalbard	Visa not required	Unlimited period under Svalbard Treaty.
United Kingdom
Akrotiri and Dhekelia	Visa not required	90 days within 180 days
Anguilla	Visa not required	3 months
Bermuda	Visa required	
British Indian Ocean Territory	Special permit required	
British Virgin Islands	Visa not required	1 month
Cayman Islands	Visa required	
Falkland Islands (Malvinas)	Visa required	
Gibraltar	Visa required	
Montserrat	Visa not required	6 months
Pitcairn Islands	Visa not required	14 days visa free and landing fee US$35 or tax of US$5 if not going ashore.
Saint Helena	Visa not required	
Ascension Island	eVisa	3 months within any year period
Tristan da Cunha	Permission required	Permission to land required for 15/30 pounds sterling (yacht/ship passenger) for Tristan da Cunha Island or 20 pounds sterling for Gough Island, Inaccessible Island or Nightingale Islands.
South Georgia and the South Sandwich Islands	Permit required	Pre-arrival permit from the Commissioner required (72 hours/1 month for 110/160 pounds sterling).
Turks and Caicos Islands	Visa required	
United States
American Samoa	Entry permit required	
Guam	Visa required	
Northern Mariana Islands	Visa required	
Puerto Rico	Visa required	
U.S. Virgin Islands	Visa required	
Antarctica and adjacent islands
Special permits required for Bouvet Island, British Antarctic Territory, French Southern and Antarctic Lands, Argentine Antarctica, (Australia) Australian Antarctic Territory, (Antártica Chilena Province) Chilean Antarctic Territory, (Australia) Heard Island and McDonald Islands, (Norway) Peter I Island, (Norway) Queen Maud Land, (New Zealand) Ross Dependency.

== See also ==
- Visa policy of Honduras
- Honduran passport
