= John Ferruggio =

American flight attendant (1925–2010)

- Born: John Ferruggio; July 6, 1925; Boston, Massachusetts, U.S.
- Died: June 19, 2010 (aged 84); Milton, Massachusetts, U.S.
- Occupation: In-flight director
- Known for: Evacuation of Pan Am Flight 93

John Joseph Ferruggio (July 6, 1925 – June 19, 2010) was an American in-flight director who led the evacuation of Pan Am Flight 93, which was hijacked by the Popular Front for the Liberation of Palestine. There were no fatalities among the plane's 153 passengers and crew due to Ferruggio's actions. The plane exploded on the runway in Cairo shortly after everyone had evacuated the aircraft.

== Biography ==
=== Early life ===
Ferruggio was born to Sicilian immigrant parents in the North End of Boston. He was the youngest of the family's three children. The family moved to South Boston, where they enrolled him early in school in order to learn English. He graduated from South Boston High School.

Ferruggio forged his father's signature in order to enlist in the United States Navy during World War II due to his age. He participated in the Guadalcanal Campaign and the Battle of Iwo Jima with a Marine unit. Ferruggio returned to South Boston following the end of World War II. He worked jobs in area shipyards and restaurants before joining Pan Am in 1954 as a flight attendant. Ferruggio married his wife, Susan Wilson, who was raised in Newton, Massachusetts, and worked as a ballet dancer in New York City, in 1961.

=== Pan Am Flight 93 ===
Ferruggio was the in-flight director of Pan Am Flight 93 on September 6, 1970, when the plane was hijacked by two men armed with grenades and handguns. The Pan Am flight, carrying 152 passengers and 17 crew members, including Ferruggio, was scheduled to fly from Amsterdam to New York City. However, the hijackers forced the pilots to divert the plane to Beirut, where a third hijacker boarded with dynamite, before flying to Cairo, Egypt.

Ferruggio, who instructed passengers to remain calm, asked the hijackers what would happen when the Pan Am flight landed in Egypt. The hijackers told him that the plane would be detonated eight minutes after landing. The dynamite's fuse was lit during the plane's descent into Cairo International Airport. In a 2006 interview for Hijacked, a television documentary which aired as part of the PBS television series, American Experience, an audio recording made by passenger Walter M Rohlfs captured Ferruggio telling the plane's flight attendants, "Now hear this and hear it good. When this plane comes to a complete stop...don’t wait for me, don’t wait for the captain, and don’t wait for Jesus Christ. We are going to evacuate this plane, like right now."

Ferruggio led the evacuation of passengers from the plane in Cairo. All passengers and crew were evacuated from the plane in less than a minute and a half, which Ferruggio later remarked at a 1970 news conference was "the fastest I’ve ever seen [evacuation] done and the fastest I’ve ever heard of." The last crew members - including Ferrugio - deplaned seconds before the plane exploded on the runway.

=== Later life ===
Ferruggio moved with his family to Milton, Massachusetts, in the early 1970s. He retired from Pan Am during the 1980s and ran a real estate business in South Boston.

John Ferruggio died of organ failure at Milton Hospital in Milton, Massachusetts, on June 19, 2010, at the age of 84. He was survived by his wife, Susan; three daughters, Joann Kerzel, Lisa DeLuca and Donna Lee York; and six grandchildren. He was buried in Blue Hill Cemetery in Braintree, Massachusetts.
