= Leila Khaled =

Palestinian militant and activist (born 1944)

- ليلى خالد
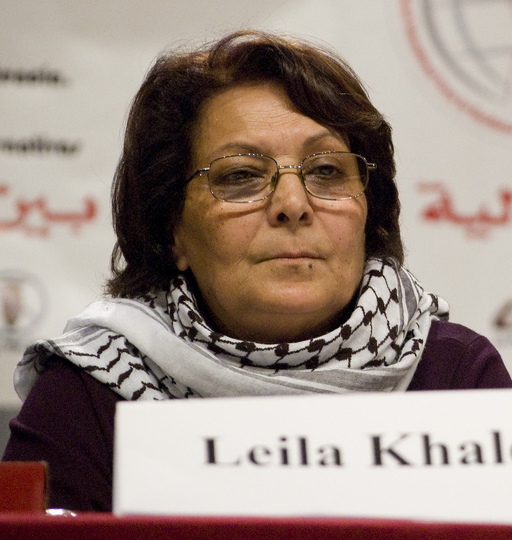
- Khaled at the Beirut International Forum for Resistance, Anti-Imperialism, Solidarity between Peoples, and Alternatives, 2009
- Born: April 9, 1944 (age 82); Haifa, Mandatory Palestine
- Organization: Popular Front for the Liberation of Palestine
- Known for: Pro-Palestinian militancy
- Movement: Arab Nationalist Movement

Leila Khaled (Arabic: ليلى خالد [ˈlajla ˈxaːled]; born April 9, 1944) is a Palestinian activist and former militant who is a member of the Popular Front for the Liberation of Palestine (PFLP). She is famous for her role in two plane hijackings, and she was the second woman to be involved in such an operation. (Note: Khaled is sometimes described as the first woman to hijack a plane. However, in 1966 Maria Cristina Verrier, an Argentine woman, participated in the hijack of Aerolíneas Argentinas Flight 648. Amina Dahbour, another PFLP member, had participated in the attack on El Al Flight 432 in February 1969, but this was not a hijack: the attackers did not board the plane, but instead attacked it from outside.)

Khaled gained her prominence for her role in the TWA Flight 840 hijacking in 1969 and one of the four simultaneous Dawson's Field hijackings the following year as part of the campaign of Black September in Jordan. After being imprisoned, she was released in a prisoner exchange for civilian hostages kidnapped by other PFLP members.

== Early life ==
Khaled was born on April 9, 1944, in Haifa, Mandatory Palestine, to Arab parents. Her family fled to Lebanon on April 13, 1948, as part of the 1948 Palestinian expulsion and flight, leaving her father behind. At the age of 15, following in the footsteps of her brother, she joined the pan-Arab Arab Nationalist Movement, originally established in the late 1940s by George Habash, then a medical student at the American University of Beirut. The Palestinian branch of this movement became the Popular Front for the Liberation of Palestine after the 1967 Six-Day War. Khaled spent some time teaching in Kuwait.

== Hijackings ==
=== TWA Flight 840 (1969) ===
On August 29, 1969, Khaled was part of a team that hijacked TWA Flight 840 on its way from Rome to Tel Aviv, diverting the Boeing 707 to Damascus. According to some media sources, the PFLP leadership thought that Yitzhak Rabin, then Israeli ambassador to the United States, would be on board; he was not. She claims she ordered the pilot to fly over Haifa, so she could see her birthplace. No one was injured, but after the passengers disembarked, the hijackers blew up the nose section of the aircraft. After this hijacking, and a photograph of her holding an AK-47 rifle and wearing a kaffiyeh was reproduced in many publications, she underwent six plastic surgery operations on her nose and chin to conceal her identity and allow her to take part in a future hijacking, and because she did not want to wear the face of an icon.

=== El Al Flight 219 (1970) ===
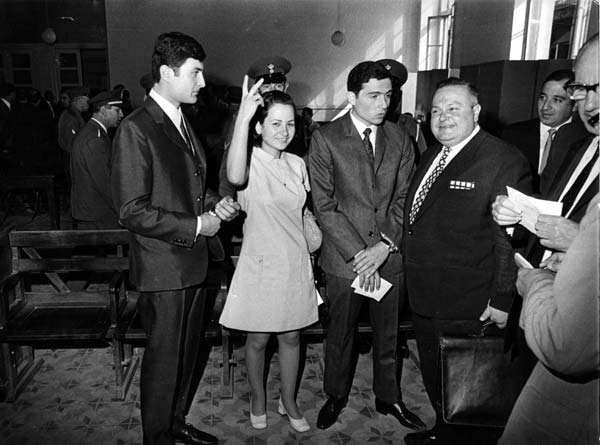
Khaled in Damascus after her release from the United Kingdom in 1970

On September 6, 1970, Khaled and Patrick Argüello, a Nicaraguan–American, attempted to hijack El Al Flight 219 from Amsterdam to New York City as part of the Dawson's Field hijackings, a series of almost simultaneous hijackings carried out by the PFLP. Khaled and Argüello threatened to detonate grenades if they were not granted access to the cockpit. The pilots refused to comply, and instead put the plane into a nosedive. Though sources differ on the chronology of these events, in the resulting scuffle someone hit Argüello in the head with a bottle of whiskey; Argüello shot and injured a crew member and reportedly threw a grenade which did not explode towards the passengers; and sky marshals shot Argüello multiple times, mortally wounding him. The pilot diverted the aircraft to Heathrow Airport in London. An ambulance took the injured crew member and Argüello to the hospital. The crew member survived while Argüello died in the ambulance. Khaled was arrested and later released during a hostage exchange.

== Later life ==
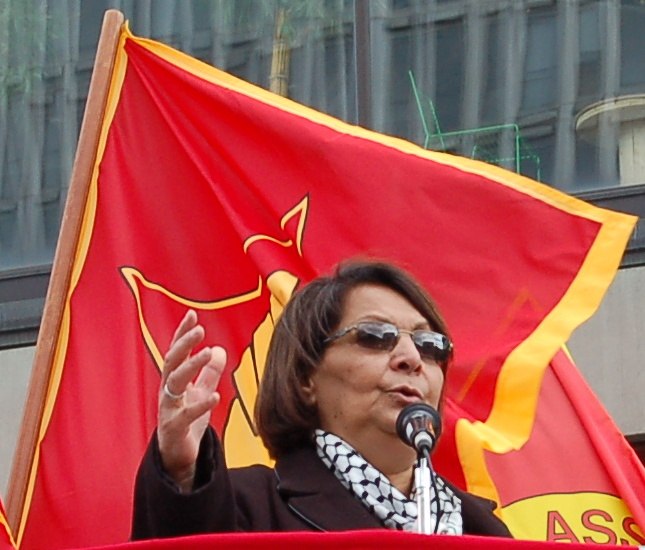
Khaled in Sweden in 2011

Khaled has stated in interviews that she developed a fondness for the United Kingdom when her first visitor in jail, an immigration officer, wanted to know why she had arrived in the country without a valid visa. She also developed a relationship with the two policewomen assigned to guard her in Ealing and later corresponded with them. Khaled continued to return to the UK for speaking engagements until as late as 2002, although she was refused a visa by the British embassy in 2005 to address a meeting at the Féile an Phobail in Belfast, where she was invited as a speaker. Eventually she managed to speak to people at the Belfast Féile through a video link.

In 2000, when asked what she thought about the Israeli–Palestinian peace process, she stated "You know, it's a process, but it's not a peace process. it's a political process where the balance of forces is for the Israelis and not for us and they have all the cards to play with and the Palestinians have nothing to depend on, especially when the PLO is not united." Khaled also supports the Kurdish political movement surrounding the Peoples' Democratic Party (HDP) and drew attention to the similar fates of the Palestinian and the Kurdish people. She has become involved in politics, becoming a member of the Palestinian National Council and appearing regularly at the World Social Forum.

Khaled was married to physician Fayez Rashid (1950–2023) and lived with their two sons Bader and Bashar in Amman, Jordan. She is irreligious. She was the subject of a film entitled Leila Khaled, Hijacker, directed by Palestinian filmmaker Lina Makboul. It premiered in November 2005 at the International Documentary Film Festival in Amsterdam.

In November 2017, Khaled was refused entry to Rome, Italy at the Leonardo da Vinci–Fiumicino Airport, and was forced to return to Amman as she is a member of a group considered a terrorist organization by the Italian government. In mid-September 2020, Khaled was scheduled to speak at a virtual Zoom conference at San Francisco State University hosted by Rabab Abdulhadi and Tomomi Kinukawa. Following lobbying by the Jewish coalition group "End Jewish Hatred", Zoom Video Communications along with YouTube and Facebook, prevented the conference from using their video conferencing software and platforms, citing compliance with U.S. export control, sanctions, and anti-terrorism laws.

== In popular culture ==
Khaled holding an AK-47, taken in October 1969

Khaled was the subject of an artwork portrait made entirely out of lipsticks, "The Icon", created by artist Amer Shomali using 14 colors, and 3,500 lipsticks. The song "Like Leila Khaled Said" from The Teardrop Explodes' 1981 album Wilder is a love song to Khaled. Songwriter Julian Cope said it was a love song to her "cos I thought she was so beautiful. But I know that the whole thing was like bad news." The Johannesburg City Council passed a motion in November 2018 to change the name of Sandton Drive in Johannesburg to Leila Khaled Drive. The American consulate in Johannesburg is located on the street.

Writer Chris Boucher has said that he named the character of savage warrior Leela from Doctor Who after Khaled. The 10th song of the album Friværdi, released on September 26, 2005, by the Danish rock band Magtens Korridorer, is entitled "Leila Khaled". Leila Khaled: Hijacker is a 2006 documentary about Leila Khaled by Swedish-Palestinian filmmaker Lina Makboul. The album Olive no Ki no Shita de, released in 2007 by the Japanese rock singer Panta, features a song entitled "Leila's Ballade". This song's lyrics were written by former Japanese Red Army member Fusako Shigenobu and her daughter Mei Shigenobu. Khaled is mentioned by Fun-da-mental in "Mother India", on the Love India CD (2010) widely distributed in the United States by Starbucks. In 2012, Khaled was invited to a ceremony for the 40th anniversary of the Lod Airport massacre by a Japanese far-left group in Kyoto, at which Panta performed the song in front of Khaled.

== Sources ==
- Leila Khaled – hijacked by destiny, a Friday Times interview at Al-Jazeerah.info
- Interview with Aviation Security 5 September 2000 Philip Baum's edited interview with Leila Khaled
- Leila Khaled: Hijacker – Documentary by Lina Makboul
