= El Al Flight 432 =

Terrorist attack at Zurich Airport in 1969

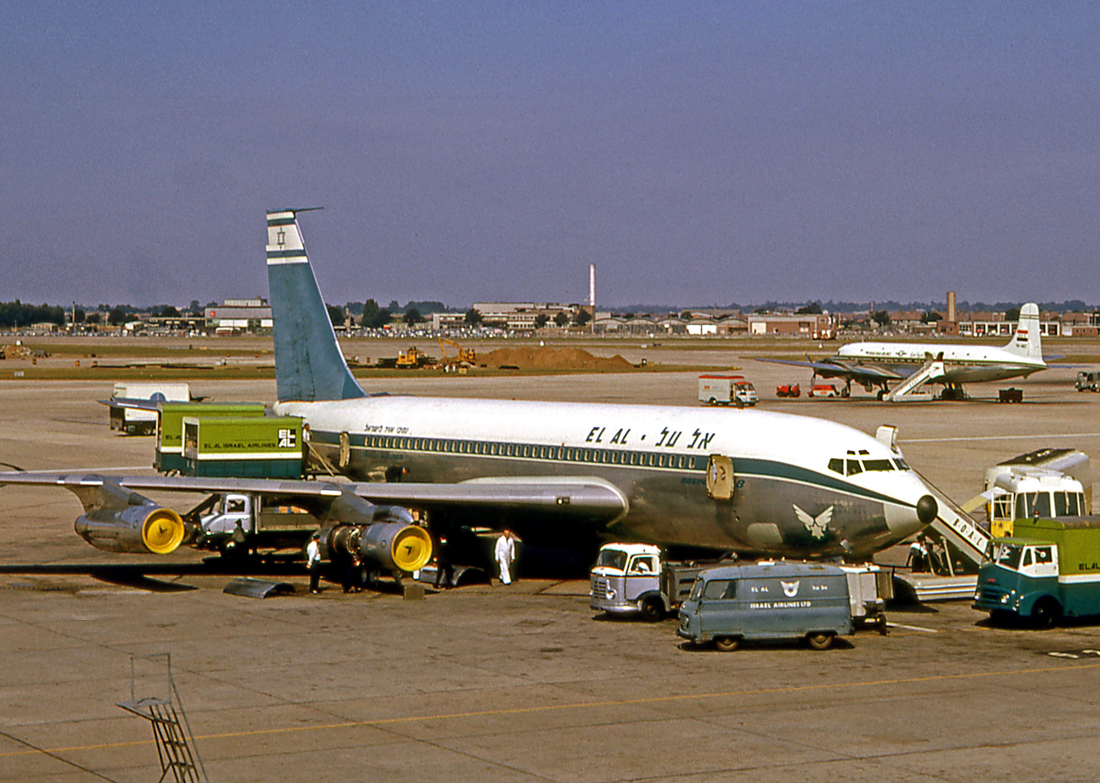
- 4X-ABB, the aircraft involved in the attacking

Terrorist Attack
- Date: 18 February 1969
- Summary: Terrorist attack
- Site: Zurich Airport, Kloten, Switzerland

Aircraft
- Aircraft type: Boeing 720-058B
- Operator: El Al
- IATA flight No.: LY432
- ICAO flight No.: ELY432
- Call sign: ELAL 432
- Registration: 4X-ABB
- Flight origin: Schiphol Airport, Amsterdam, Netherlands
- Stopover: Zurich Airport, Zurich, Switzerland
- Destination: Ben Gurion International Airport, Tel Aviv, Israel
- Passengers: 17
- Crew: 11
- Fatalities: 1
- Injuries: 6
- Survivors: 16

El Al Flight 432 was a Boeing 720-058B (a shortened Boeing 707-120B) that was attacked by a squad of four armed Palestinian militants, members of the Popular Front for the Liberation of Palestine, while it was preparing for takeoff at the Zurich Airport in Kloten, Switzerland on 18 February 1969. The plane, which was on its way from Amsterdam to Tel Aviv via Zurich, was due to take off at Zurich Airport. Several of the crew members were injured during the attack; one later died of his injuries. The plane was severely damaged. A greater disaster was averted when Mordechai Rahamim, an undercover Israeli security agent stationed on the plane, opened fire at the attackers and killed the terrorist leader. Rahamim and the three surviving attackers were arrested and tried by Swiss authorities. The attackers were found guilty and given prison sentences, while Rahamim was acquitted.

== The attack ==
The terrorist cell ambushed the plane which was preparing for takeoff at the Zurich Airport in Kloten. During that time the plane had 17 passengers and 11 crew members on board. Leaping out of a vehicle parked near a hangar, two terrorists opened fire with AK-47 assault rifles, and another two tossed incendiary grenades as well as dynamite that failed to explode. The cockpit and fuselage were hit, seriously wounding several people including co-pilot Yoram Peres, who died of his wounds a month later. The plane's security guard Mordechai Rahamim, a twenty two-year old former soldier in the Israeli elite special forces unit Sayeret Matkal, ran to the cockpit and fired at the attackers from the window with his Beretta .22 pistol, and then jumped out of the plane through the rear emergency slide door and continued the shootout with the attackers. During the shootout, Rahamim killed the squad leader, and the battle eventually ended when the Swiss security forces arrived at the scene. Rahamim helped the Swiss authorities apprehend the remaining attackers, but was himself arrested, and his weapon confiscated.

== Aftermath ==
Damage to the aircraft was estimated at $100,000.

Rahamim was arrested by the Swiss police, along with the members of the terrorist cell. The terrorists were found to be carrying many weapons and explosives as well as leaflets in German which were intended to be used to explain the goals of the operation to the Swiss people, comparing it to William Tell's operations. During an investigation it became clear that the terrorists came to Switzerland from Damascus, and the weapons and explosives were brought to Switzerland through diplomatic mail of an Arab country.

During the interrogation Mordechai Rahamim admitted that he worked for Israel's security services. After a month in arrest he was released on bail until the beginning of his trial. Rahamim returned to Israel.

=== The trial ===
On 27 November 1969, the trial of Rahamim and the three terrorists, Mohamed Abu Al-Haija, Ibrahim Tawfik Youssef and Amina Dahbour, began in Winterthur, Switzerland. The state of Israel sent the state prosecutor Gabriel Bach to Switzerland to handle the defense of Rahamim. An indictment was filed against the three terrorists which included deliberate homicide of a person. The indictment against Rahamim included two sections: deliberate homicide of a person due to a serious excitement which occurred as a result of circumstances justifying the excitement, and an illegal action on behalf of a foreign country.

During the trial, Israel was forced to admit for the first time that security personnel accompany Israeli flights, to prevent hijackings and terrorism from happening in the air.

On 23 December 1969, the trial ended. Rahamim was acquitted on charges of killing the terrorist squad leader and three terrorists were sentenced to twelve years imprisonment and hard labor. They were released a year later, in September 1970, following the Dawson's Field hijackings by members of a Palestinian terrorist organization who demanded the release of the imprisoned terrorists.
