= Fayez Rashid =

Palestinian writer (1950–2023)

- فايز رشيد
- Born: 11 September 1950; Qalqilya, Nablus Governorate, Jordanian West Bank
- Died: 27 September 2023 (aged 73); Amman, Capital Governorate, Jordan
- Occupation: Writer
- Spouse: Laila Khalid

Fayez Rashid (Arabic: فايز رشيد; 11 September 1950 – 27 September 2023) was a Palestinian political writer. He was a member of the General Union of Palestinian Writers and Journalists.

== Biography ==
Rashid was born in 1950 in the city of Qalqilya in the West Bank in Palestine (at the time under Jordanian rule). He earned his Ph.D. in natural medicine. He was a member of the Jordanian Medical Association and a member of the General Union of Palestinian Writers and Journalists. In 1970, the Israeli authorities deported him to Jordan after two years of detention in Israeli prisons.

Rasheed was a political writer, novelist, short story writer, and researcher in strategic affairs. His research papers and articles have been published in various Arab magazines and newspapers. He was a member of the Jordanian Writers Association and a member of the General Union of Arab Writers and Writers, and he wrote about the Palestinian and Arab-Israeli conflict.

== Death ==
Fayez Rashid died on 27 September 2023, at the age of 73.

== Works ==
- "Al-Jarrah Tashhad, Memoirs of a Doctor in the Time of Siege", 1983.
- "Falsification of history in response to Netanyahu's book: A Place Under the Sun", 1997.
- "Fifty years after the Nakba", 1999.
- "Wda'an Ayohal, Lilac", a collection of short stories, 2003.
- "The Culture of Resistance", 2004.
- "The Falsehood of Israel's Democracy", 2004.
- "Guitart Lil", Arab Scientific Publishers.
- "Laila Khaled in the eyes of some free women and men of the world", 2021.
