= Dawson Field =

Former military airfield in Zarqa, Jordan

- Zarqa Governorate in Jordan

Location
- Shown within Jordan
- Coordinates: 32°06′19″N 36°09′42″E

Site history
- Battles/wars: World War II
- Events: Dawson's Field hijackings

Dawson Field, also known as Zerka Airfield and Al-Thawra Airport, was a military airfield located thirty-five miles northeast of Amman in Zarqa, Zarqa Governorate, Jordan. During World War II, it was used as an airstrip by the RAF until its withdrawal in the 1950s. It remained abandoned until it was reactivated by Wadie Haddad for use by the Popular Front for the Liberation of Palestine, and gained the nickname Revolutionary Field. In 1970, Dawson Field was involved with a mass aircraft hijacking, with three aircraft forced to divert and land at the airfield.

== History ==
During World War II, the Royal Air Force (RAF) maintained a remote airstrip at Zarqa. It was named Dawson Field, and a signals school was based there for desert exercises due to the ideally flat terrain it presented. The airfield was named after Air Chief Marshal Sir Walter Dawson in recognition of his achievements whilst he was an Air Officer Commanding of RAF command AHQ Levant. In 1943, a bombing range was present near the airfield. A camp was also established at Dawson Field, which consisted of 7 tents and a flag pole with the RAF flag. Supermarine Spitfires of the No. 32 Squadron RAF commonly flew from the airfield, and also Junkers Ju 52s captured from the Luftwaffe. In 1958, the RAF withdrew from Dawson Field, and it remained abandoned.

=== Post-war ===
In May 1958, the runways and taxiways were extended 1,200 feet to the east, with the total runway length measuring 4,600 feet. There were no aircraft based here, and it was used as a vehicle and artillery park by the nearby Zarqa Military Camp, equipped with 270 field artillery, 14 tanks, 16 prime movers, and approximately 930 vehicles. Throughout the 1950s and 1960s, no aviation activity was reported at Dawson Field, which was referred to as "Zerka Airfield". In the 1970s, Palestinian militant Wadie Haddad organized the rehabilitation of the former airfield, making it serviceable for aircraft use. It was renamed to Al-Thawra Airport and was used by the Popular Front for the Liberation of Palestine (PFLP). The name translated to "Revolution Field", and locals of Zarqa referred to the mud-flat itself as Ga Khanna. The landing ground is described as a mud flat, which hardened and cracked every summer, leading to unideal landing conditions. At the time, Al-Thawra Airport was located in a remote desert region. On 6 September 1970, preparations began, one day before the scheduled hijackings. 100 empty oil drums, diesel and kerosene, a wooden ladder, picks and shovels, loudspeakers, and three boxes of explosives were organised at the site. About 30 armed men were also assembled. The group then hastily cleared the mud-flat to allow multiple aircraft to land.

=== Hijackings ===
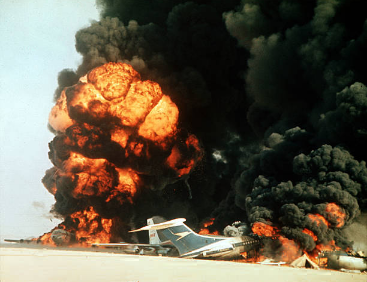
Aircraft at Dawson Field being blown up by the PFLP after it was evacuated.

With the motive of freeing Palestinian prisoners imprisoned in Europe and Israel, members of the PFLP hijacked four airlines bound for New York City and one for London. Three of the aircraft were forced to divert and land at Al-Thawra Airport, and one landed at Cairo. Due to the unsuitable landing conditions of the airfield for a Boeing 747-121, Pan Am Flight 93 was redirected to Cairo, Egypt. On 7 September 1970, the hijackers held a press conference for 60 members of the media who had made their way to the airport. After the hostages were evacuated, all three aircraft were blown up on 11–12 September 1970.

Following the event, the Black September conflicts were ignited and Amman Airport was under constant mortar fire. As re supply airlifts could not take place at Amman, Dawson Field was selected as an emergency airlift site. It subsequently gained another nickname by Jordanians, Raja’iyah Airfield (meaning Reactionary). Operations commenced in October 1970 with the authorisation of 20 airlift sorties, with two daily flights entering Dawson Field. Each flight—utilising the Lockheed C-141 Starlifter—carried ammunition to support Jordanian forces.

By the 1990s, Dawson Field was occasionally used by military aircraft. It primarily supported dispersal, staging, and aircraft recovery operations.

== Accidents and incidents ==
- On 22 October 1947, a Supermarine Spitfire Mk XVIII of the No. 32 Squadron RAF registered TP365 crashed at Dawson Field. The Spitfire was the last of three in a formation landing at Dawsons Field, and the pilot decided to abandon the landing due to the dust 'kicked up' by previous aircraft. During the second attempt at landing, the pilot forgot to lower the undercarriage and accidentally belly landed the aircraft, severely damaging the underside of the airframe. After the incident, the damage was assessed as Category E. The aircraft was not repaired and struck off charge.
