= Honduran nationality law =

Honduran nationality law is regulated by the Constitution, the Migration and Aliens Act (Spanish: Ley de Migración y Extranjería), the 2014 Law on Protection of Honduran Migrants and their Families (Spanish: Ley de Protección de los Hondureños Migrantes y sus Familiares) and relevant treaties to which Honduras is a signatory. These laws determine who is, or is eligible to be, a citizen of Honduras. The legal means to acquire nationality and formal membership in a nation differ from the relationship of rights and obligations between a national and the nation, known as citizenship. Honduran nationality is typically obtained either on the principle of jus soli, i.e. by birth in Honduras; or under the rules of jus sanguinis, i.e. by birth abroad to a parent with Honduran nationality. It can also be granted to a permanent resident who has lived in the country for a given period of time through naturalization.

== Acquiring Honduran nationality ==
Hondurans may acquire nationality through birth or naturalization.

=== By birthright ===
Birthright nationality applies to:

- Persons born within the territory, except those who are born to foreign diplomats;
- Persons born on warships or military planes belonging to Honduras and those born on commercial vessels in Honduran territorial waters;
- Foundlings discovered in the territory; or
- Persons born abroad to at least one parent who is a birthright national. Children born abroad to naturalized Hondurans are not entitled to birthright nationality.

For persons born abroad who qualify as Honduran by birth through a Honduran parent, registration of the foreign birth documents an existing birthright nationality rather than constituting naturalization. A birth may be registered through a Honduran diplomatic or consular officer, who forwards the record for incorporation into the civil registry in Honduras. If the birth was not registered through the consular route within the applicable period, the interested person may later request registration directly through the Registro Nacional de las Personas.

=== By naturalization ===
Naturalization requires completion of an application of request that is supported by the requisite documents to establish eligibility. Applications are processed by the General Directorate of Migration and Alien Status (Spanish: Dirección General de Migración y Extranjería). Its general requirements include adequate legal capacity and means of self-support, lack of a criminal record in Honduras, and proficiency with the Spanish language. Applicants must pass a test on the constitution, geography and history of the nation. In special cases, the National Congress of Honduras can grant nationality for either exceptional service to the nation or because of marriage with a birthright, not naturalized, Honduran. Those who may apply for ordinary naturalization include:

- Foreigners who have resided in the country for three consecutive years;
- Spanish or Ibero-Americans who have resided in the territory for at least two years;
- Nationals of other Central American states who have resided in Honduras for one year;
- Foreigners authorized and sponsored by the government to engage in programs to reach agricultural, industrial, or scientific benchmarks and who have resided in the country for at least year.

== Loss of Honduran nationality ==
Naturalized citizens can lose nationality by having dual nationality, providing assistance to an enemy of the state, or cancellation of a nationality card. Birthright Hondurans cannot lose their nationality, even if they obtain another nationality.

== Dual nationality ==
A reciprocity agreement signed with Spain in 1966, allowed Spanish and Honduran birthright nationals to naturalize without revoking their nationality of origin. Since 2002, a decree amending the constitution has allowed dual nationality for birthright Hondurans, though naturalized citizens cannot have more than one nationality.

== History ==
Honduras declared independence from Spain in 1821 in conjunction with the other provinces which had been part of the Captaincy General of Guatemala. After an unsuccessful attempt to become part of the Mexican Empire, in 1823, Honduras joined the Federal Republic of Central America and in 1824, the Republic adopted a federal constitution for the member states of Costa Rica, El Salvador, Guatemala, Honduras, and Nicaragua. The constitution defined nationals as all inhabitants, regardless of their ancestry, length of residence, other nationality, or where they were born and abolished slavery. It provided for naturalization based upon marriage, establishing residence for five years, and other criteria. Honduras developed its own first constitution in 1825, but neither it or its successor the Constitution of 1831 defined who were considered as natural or naturalized. In 1839, a new constitution provided that nationals were people born in the territory or who acquired naturalization as a foreigner. It also contained a provision that dual nationality resulted in the revocation of Honduran nationality.

In 1842, 1847, and 1852 Honduras, along with El Salvador and Nicaragua unsuccessfully attempted to establish a confederation. A new constitution adopted in 1848, established that in addition to people born in the territory, birthright nationals were people who were born abroad to Hondurans engaged in service to the government, temporarily exiled, or who were abroad because of artistic, commercial, or scientific activities. The 1848 Constitution also gave preferential treatment to foreign husbands of Honduran women, allowing them naturalize after a two-year residence, but had no similar scheme for foreign wives of Honduran men. Birthright nationality was expanded in the Constitution of 1865 to include as birthright nationals citizens of the other Central American republics who established residence in Honduras and chose Honduran nationality. Keeping the preferential clause for foreign men married to Honduran women, the Constitutions of 1865 and 1873 lowered the residency requirement to one year. In 1880, Honduras adopted the Chilean Civil Code, which despite attempts to modify it and adopt other codes, basically remained in place until 1906. Article 84 of the 1880 code required that a married Honduran woman had the same domicilio (permanent address) as her spouse and Article 172 gave the husband marital authority over his wife's person and property. When it was modified in 1906, the Civil Code provided in Article 48 that a married woman was required to follow the nationality of her husband. Women could neither obtain nor relinquish nationality independently from the husbands and a change in the husband's nationality automatically changed the nationality of his wife and minor children.

The provisions of who was a Honduran remained mostly unchanged in the subsequent constitutions between 1865 and 1924; however immigration statutes limited the influx of African, Arab, Armenian, Chinese, Syrian and Turkish immigrants via prohibitive taxes. Modifications in 1934 barred the entry of Arabs, Armenians, Czechoslovaks, Lebanese, Palestinians, Poles, Syrians, and Turks, unless they could provide documentation that they would be engaged in the development of agriculture or industry. Blacks, Chinese, and Roma were expressly forbidden entry. The 1924 constitution provided that if a woman had lost her nationality by marriage, she could reacquire Honduran nationality by naturalization as a foreigner if the marriage had terminated. For foreign women who had gained nationality by marriage, they could relinquish it by leaving Honduras and obtaining another nationality. Legitimate or legitimized children, born in Honduras to Honduran parents or foreigners domiciled in Honduras or who had been born in Honduras, were established as birthright nationals. Illegitimate children born anywhere to Honduran parents were Honduran if the father was Honduran and legally recognized the child. The mother's nationality could only be derived if the child was unrecognized by the father. Children born abroad to Honduran parents could also be Honduran by declaration upon reaching majority. The constitution also allowed both Spaniards and citizens of Latin American countries to naturalize after a one-year residency and a declaration that they wished to be Honduran.

In 1933, the Honduran delegation to the Pan-American Union's Montevideo conference, Miguel Paz Barahona, Augusto Coello and Luis Bográn signed the Inter-American Convention on the Nationality of Women, which became effective in 1934, legally reserving limitations based on domestic law and their constitution. The Constitution of 1936 repealed the provision for married woman to lose their nationality and stated that neither they, nor their minor children's nationality was effected by a change in marital status. It also removed birthright nationality from children born to foreigners in transit or those in the service of a foreign government, and permitted children born abroad from either parent to have birthright nationality. The Constitution of 1957 expanded birth in the territory to include foundlings and children born upon Honduran ships or planes. In 1965 the provisions eliminated the clause regarding foreigners in transit and extended the birth of children on ships or in planes to include any vessel in Honduran waters. The Constitution of 1965, also reintroduced the concept of naturalization with preferential requirements for spouses of Honduran nationals. According to the Constitution of 1982, children born abroad must have at least one parent who was a birthright national and spouses obtaining a preferential naturalization process must be married to a birthright national. For eighteen months between January 1991 and June 1992, a special naturalization program, called the Law for the Naturalization of Far East Citizens (Spanish: Ley para la Naturalización de Ciudadanos Orientales) allowed Honduran nationality to be purchased for US$25,000 with an additional $3,000 per dependent, waiving residency requirements and prohibitions against dual nationality. It also granted tax exemptions to those who chose to settle in the country. After official termination of the scheme, the judiciary investigated and discovered wide corruption related to the program.
