= Visa policy of Honduras =

Policy on permits required to enter Honduras

Visitors to Honduras must obtain a visa from one of the Honduran diplomatic missions unless they are citizens from one of the visa-exempt countries.

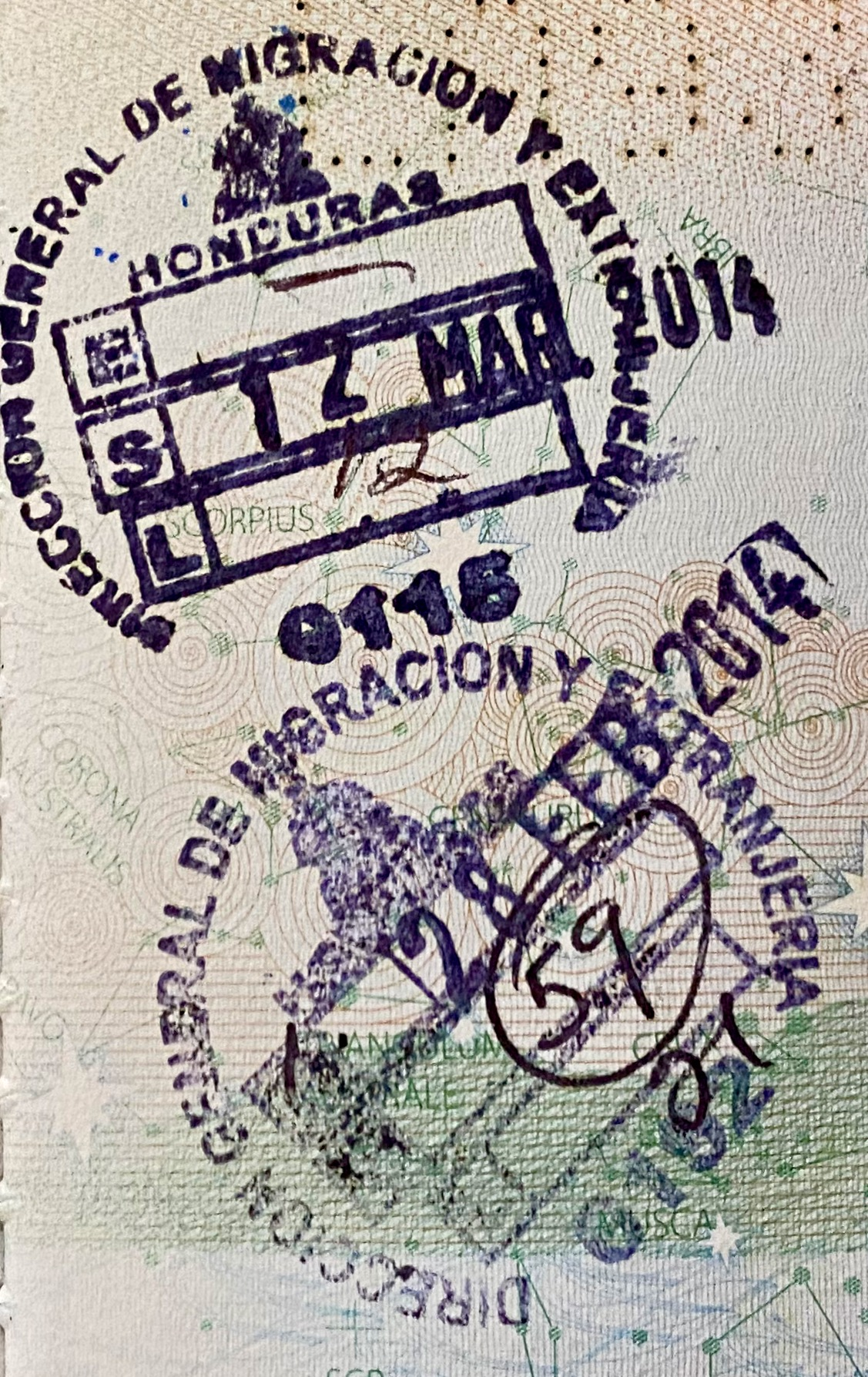
Entry and exit stamps

All visitors must hold a passport valid for at least 3 months from the date of arrival.

== Visa policy map ==
Visa policy of Honduras Honduras Visa not required (90 days) Visa not required (90 days) if holding a valid Canadian, Schengen or US visa; otherwise, visa required Visa required

== Visa exemption ==
=== Ordinary passports ===
Citizens of the following countries and territories may enter Honduras without a visa for stays up to the duration listed below. The stay may be extended for an additional 30 days.

90 days

- All European Union member states

- Andorra
- Antigua and Barbuda
- Argentina
- Australia
- Bahamas
- Bahrain
- Barbados
- Belize
- Bolivia
- Brazil
- Brunei
- Canada
- Chile
- Colombia
- Costa Rica
- El Salvador^{ID}
- Guatemala^{ID}
- Iceland
- Israel
- Japan
- Kuwait
- Liechtenstein
- Madagascar
- Malaysia
- Marshall Islands
- Mexico
- Monaco
- New Zealand
- Nicaragua^{ID}
- North Macedonia
- Norway
- Panama
- Paraguay
- Peru
- Qatar
- Russia
- Saint Kitts and Nevis
- Saint Lucia
- Saint Vincent and the Grenadines
- San Marino
- São Tomé and Príncipe
- Saudi Arabia
- Singapore
- Solomon Islands
- South Africa
- South Korea
- Switzerland
- Trinidad and Tobago
- Turkey
- Tuvalu
- Ukraine
- United Arab Emirates
- United Kingdom
- United States
- Uruguay
- Vanuatu
- Vatican City

3 months

- Taiwan

60 days

- Dominican Republic

_{ID – May also enter with an ID card if come from a country that is part of the CA-4 Agreement.}

Date of visa changes
- 1 June 1974: Japan
- 31 March 2009: Russia
- 25 May 2018: United Arab Emirates
- 23 October 2023: Costa Rica (resumed)
- 31 October 2026: United Kingdom (resumed)

Cancelled:

- 20 November 2017: Venezuela
- 10 October 2023: Costa Rica (was resumed on 23 October 2023)
- 15 August 2024: United Kingdom (was resumed on 31 October 2026)

==== Substitute visa ====
Citizens of other countries who would normally require visas may enter Honduras without a visa for up to 90 days if holding a valid visa issued by any Schengen Are member state, Canada or the United States (except for "C1" and "D" visas). The stay may be extended for an additional 30 days.

However, this policy does not apply to citizens of the following countries and territories:

- Afghanistan
- Algeria
- Angola
- Armenia
- Bangladesh
- Botswana
- Republic of the Congo
- DR Congo
- Cuba
- Eritrea
- Ethiopia
- Ghana
- Iran
- Iraq
- Jordan
- Kenya
- Laos
- Lebanon
- Liberia
- Libya
- Mali
- Mongolia
- Mozambique
- Nepal
- Nigeria
- North Korea
- Oman
- Pakistan
- Sierra Leone
- Somalia
- Sri Lanka
- Sudan
- Syria
- Timor-Leste
- United Kingdom^{1}
- Venezuela
- Vietnam
- Yemen

_{1 - Including all types of British passports.}

=== Non-ordinary passports ===
In addition to countries whose citizens are visa-exempt, holders of diplomatic or official / service passports of Belarus, Bolivia, China, Cuba, Dominica, Egypt, Fiji, Grenada, Guyana, Haiti, India, Jamaica, Kenya, Libya, Montenegro, Morocco, Pakistan, Papua New Guinea, Peru, Philippines, Serbia, Suriname, and Thailand and holders of diplomatic passports of Palestine may enter Honduras without a visa.

=== Future changes ===
Honduras has signed visa exemption agreements with the following countries, but they have not yet entered into force:

Country	Passports	Agreement signed on
Serbia	All	26 September 2025
Maldives	All	19 September 2023

== Central America-4 Border Control Agreement ==
The Central America-4 Border Control Agreement is a treaty between Guatemala, El Salvador, Honduras and Nicaragua. A visa issued by one of the four countries is honored by all four of the countries. The time period for the visa, however, applies to the total time spent in any of the four countries without leaving the CA-4 area.

== See also ==
- Central America-4 Border Control Agreement
- Visa requirements for Honduran citizens
