= Dawson's Field hijackings =

1970 Palestinian militant plane hijackings

- Part of Black September in Jordan and spillover of Palestinian insurgency in South Lebanon
- Three airliners were destroyed by explosion at Dawson's Field on 12 September 1970.
- Location: 32.1059°N 36.1567°E; Dawson Field, Zarqa, Jordan
- Date: 6–13 September 1970
- Target: TWA 741, Swissair 100, El Al 219, Pan Am 93, BOAC 775
- Attack type: 4 successful aircraft hijackings, 1 foiled, hostage crisis
- Weapons: Firearms and hand grenades
- Deaths: 1 (1 hijacker)
- Injuries: 1<
- Perpetrator: Popular Front for the Liberation of Palestine (PFLP)
- Defenders: Bar Lev, passengers and sky marshal (Flight 219)
- Motive: Release of Palestinian prisoners imprisoned in Europe and Israel

In September 1970, members of the Popular Front for the Liberation of Palestine (PFLP) hijacked four airliners bound for New York City and one for London. Three aircraft were forced to land at Dawson Field, a remote desert airstrip near Zarqa, Jordan, formerly Royal Air Force Station Zarqa, which then became PFLP's "Revolutionary Airport". By the end of the incident, one hijacker had been killed and one injury reported. This was the second instance of mass aircraft hijacking, after three aircraft from communist Czechoslovakia were hijacked and taken to Munich, West Germany, in 1950.

On 6 September, TWA Flight 741 from Frankfurt (a Boeing 707) and Swissair Flight 100 from Zürich (a Douglas DC-8) were forced to land at Dawson's Field. On the same day, the hijacking of El Al Flight 219 from Amsterdam (another 707) was foiled: hijacker Patrick Argüello was shot and killed, and his partner Leila Khaled was subdued and handed over to British authorities in London. Two PFLP hijackers, who were prevented from boarding the El Al flight, hijacked instead Pan Am Flight 93, a Boeing 747, diverting the large aircraft first to Beirut and then to Cairo, rather than to the small Jordanian airstrip. On 9 September, a fifth aircraft, BOAC Flight 775, a Vickers VC10 coming from Bahrain, was hijacked by a PFLP sympathizer and taken to Dawson's Field in order to pressure the British to free Khaled.

While the majority of the 310 hostages were transferred to Amman and freed on 11 September, the PFLP segregated the flight crews and Jewish passengers, keeping the 56 Jewish hostages in custody, while releasing the non-Jews. Six hostages were kept because they were men and American citizens, not necessarily Jews: Robert Norman Schwartz, a U.S. Defense Department researcher stationed in Thailand; James Lee Woods, Schwartz's assistant and security detail; Gerald Berkowitz, an American-born Jew and college chemistry professor; Rabbi Avraham Harari-Raful and his brother Rabbi Yosef Harari-Raful, two Sephardi Brooklyn school teachers; and John Hollingsworth, a U.S. State Department employee. Schwartz, whose father was Jewish, was a convert to Catholicism. On 12 September, prior to their announced deadline, the PFLP used explosives to destroy the empty planes, as they anticipated a counterstrike.

The PFLP's exploitation of Jordanian territory was an example of the increasingly autonomous Arab Palestinian activity within the Kingdom of Jordan – a serious challenge to the Hashemite monarchy of King Hussein. Hussein declared martial law on 16 September and from 17 to 27 September his forces deployed into Palestinian-controlled areas in what became known as Black September in Jordan, nearly triggering a regional war involving Syria, Iraq, and Israel.

A swift Jordanian victory, however, enabled a 30 September deal in which the remaining PFLP hostages were released in exchange for Khaled and three PFLP members in a Swiss prison.

== Hijackings ==
=== El Al Flight 219 ===
El Al Flight 219
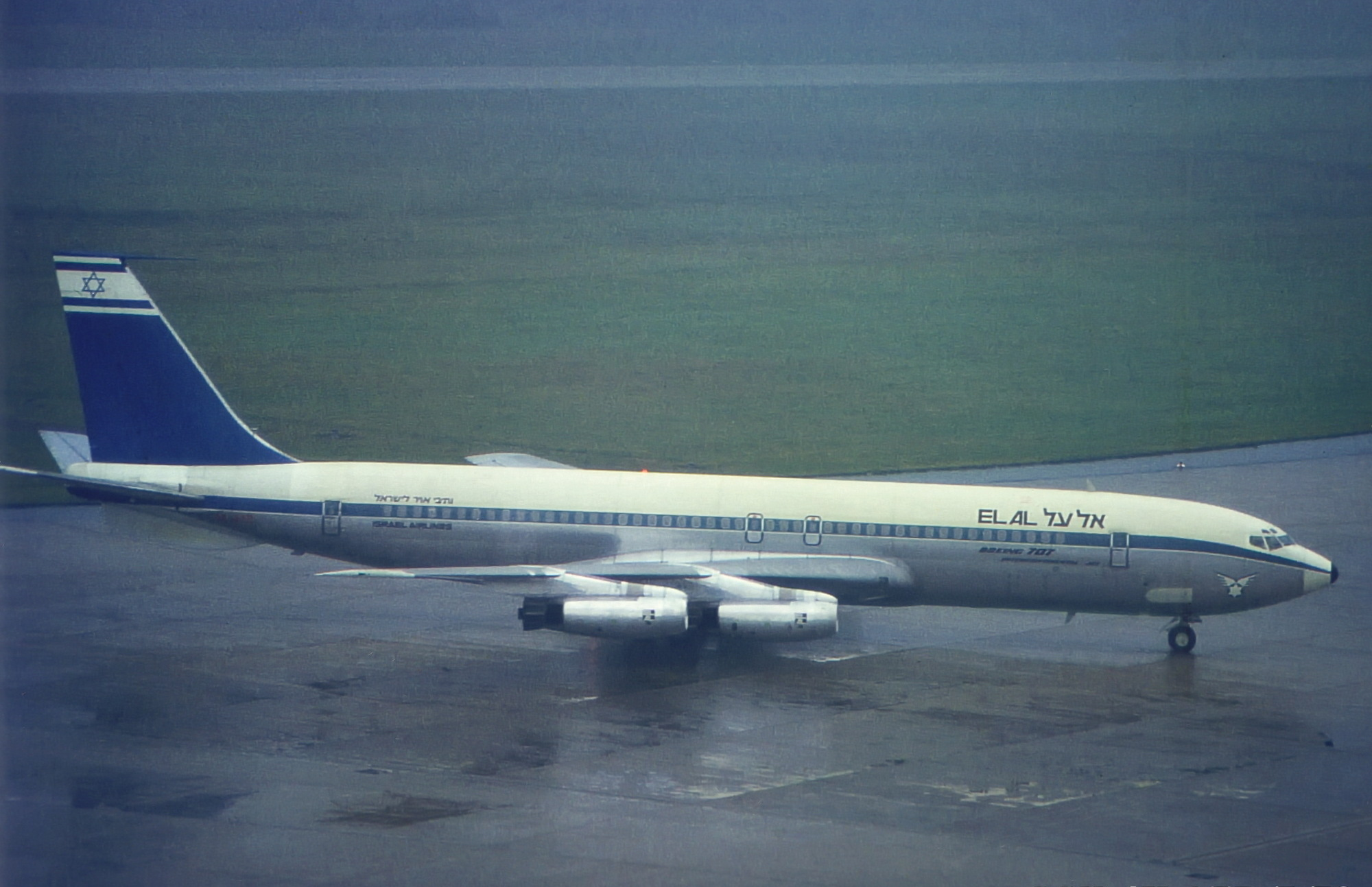
- 4X-ATB, the aircraft involved in the hijacking, seen in July 1970

Hijacking
- Date: 6 September 1970
- Summary: Attempted hijacking
- Site: English Channel

Aircraft
- Aircraft type: Boeing 707–458
- Operator: El Al Israel Airlines
- Call sign: El Al 219
- Registration: 4X-ATB
- Flight origin: Lod International Airport, Central District, Israel
- Stopover: Amsterdam Schiphol Airport, Amsterdam, Netherlands
- Destination: John F. Kennedy International Airport, New York, United States
- Occupants: 148 (including 2 hijackers)
- Passengers: 138 (including 2 hijackers)
- Crew: 10
- Fatalities: 1 (hijacker)
- Injuries: 1
- Survivors: 147 (including 1 hijacker)

El Al Flight 219, a Boeing 707 registered as 4X-ATB with serial number 18071, originated in Tel Aviv, Israel, and was headed to New York City. It had 138 passengers and 10 crew members aboard. It stopped in Amsterdam, Netherlands, and was hijacked shortly after it took off from there by Patrick Argüello, a Nicaraguan American, and Leila Khaled, a Palestinian.

The original plan was to have four hijackers aboard this flight, but two were prevented from boarding in Amsterdam by Israeli security—these two conspirators, traveling under Senegalese passports with consecutive numbers, were prevented from flying on El Al on 6 September. They purchased first-class tickets on Pan Am Flight 93 and hijacked that flight instead.

Posing as a married couple, Argüello and Khaled boarded the plane using Honduran passports—having passed through a security check of their luggage—and were seated in the second row of tourist class. Once the plane was approaching the British coast, they drew their guns and grenades and approached the cockpit, demanding entrance. According to Khaled, in an interview in 2000,

So half an hour (after take off) we had to move. We stood up. I had my two hand grenades and I showed everybody I was taking the pins out with my teeth. Patrick stood up. We heard shooting just the same minute and when we crossed the first class, people were shouting but I didn't see who was shooting because it was behind us. So Patrick told me "go forward I protect your back." So I went and then he found a hostess and she was going to catch me round the legs. So I rushed, reached to the cockpit, it was closed. So I was screaming "open the door." Then the hostess came; she said "she has two hand grenades," but they did not open (the cockpit door) and suddenly I was threatening to blow up the plane. I was saying "I will count and if you don't open I will blow up the plane."

After being informed by intercom that a hijacking was in progress, Captain Uri Bar-Lev (39), decided not to accede to their demands:

I decided that we were not going to be hijacked. The security guy was sitting here ready to jump. I told him that I was going to put the plane into negative-G mode. Everyone would fall. When you put the plane into negative, it's like being in a falling elevator. Instead of the plane flying this way, it dives and everyone who is standing falls down.

Bar Lev put the plane into a steep nosedive which threw the two hijackers off-balance. Argüello reportedly threw his sole grenade down the airliner aisle, but it failed to explode, and he was hit over the head with a bottle of whiskey by a passenger after he drew his pistol. Argüello shot steward Shlomo Vider and according to the passengers and Israeli security personnel, was then shot by a sky marshal. His accomplice Khaled was subdued by security and passengers, while the plane made an emergency landing at London Heathrow Airport; she then claimed that Argüello was shot four times in the back after he and Khaled failed to hijack the airplane. Vider underwent emergency surgery and recovered from his wounds; Argüello died in the ambulance taking both him and Khaled to Hillingdon Hospital. Khaled was then arrested by British police.

==== Nationalities on Flight 219 ====
Nationality	Passengers	Crew	Total
Israel	118	10	128
Netherlands	10	0	10
United States	9	0	9
Canada	1	0	1
Total	138	10	148

=== TWA Flight 741 ===
TWA Flight 741
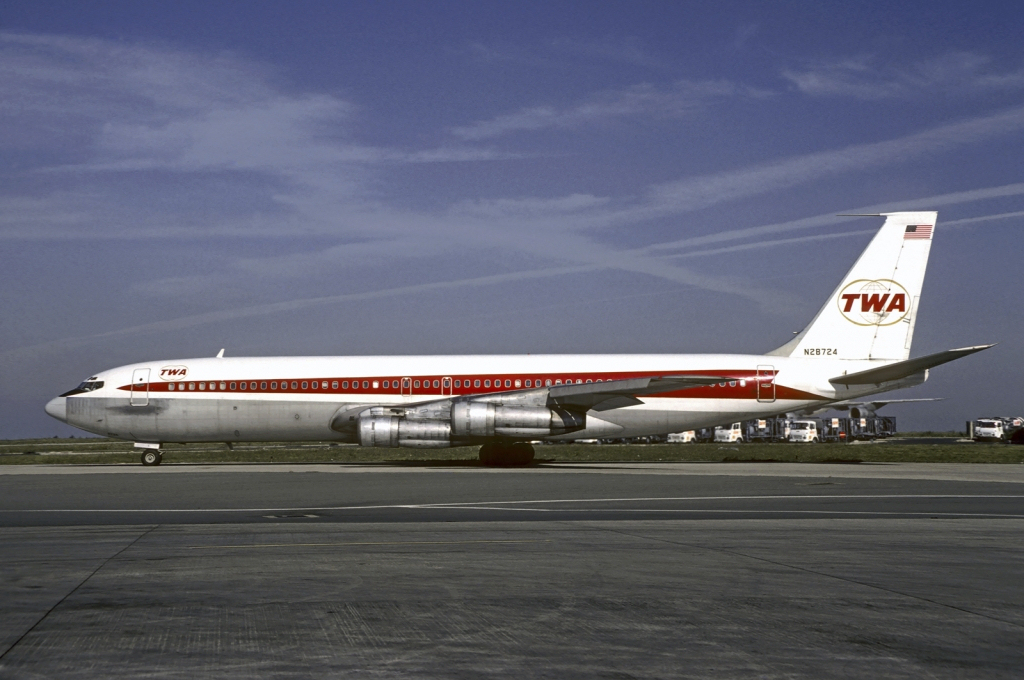
- A TWA Boeing 707–331B, similar to the one involved in the hijacking

Hijacking
- Date: 6 September 1970
- Summary: Hijacking
- Site: Brussels, Belgium

Aircraft
- Aircraft type: Boeing 707–331B
- Operator: Trans World Airlines
- Call sign: TWA 741
- Registration: N8715T
- Flight origin: Lod International Airport, Central District, Israel
- 1st stopover: Ellinikon International Airport, Athens, Greece
- 2nd stopover: Frankfurt International Airport, Frankfurt, Germany
- Destination: John F. Kennedy International Airport, New York, United States
- Occupants: 155 (including 2 hijackers)
- Passengers: 144 (including 2 hijackers)
- Crew: 11
- Fatalities: 0
- Survivors: 155 (including 2 hijackers)

TWA Flight 741, a Boeing 707 registered as N8715T with serial number 18917, was a round-the-world flight carrying 144 passengers and a crew of 11. The flight on this day was flying from Tel Aviv to Athens, Frankfurt am Main, West Germany, and then to New York City, and was hijacked over Belgium on the Frankfurt-New York leg. It was crewed by Captain Carroll D. Woods, First Officer Jim Majer and Flight Engineer Al Kiburis.

Flight 741's purser, Rudi Swinkles, recalled seeing a passenger running toward first class. Assuming it was an angry husband chasing his wife, Swinkles ran after him. The hijackers were at the cockpit door, ordering a flight attendant to open the door. The male hijacker turned around, pointing a nickel-plated .38 revolver and a hand grenade at Swinkles and yelled "Get back! Get back!" Swinkles dove behind the bulkhead first class divider.

Hijackers gained control of the cockpit. The male hijacker kept his revolver pointed at Majer until the plane landed at Dawson's Field, saying "I want you to turn this plane around." The female hijacker stated on the intercom, "This is your new captain speaking. This flight has been taken over by the Popular Front for the Liberation of Palestine. We will take you to a friendly country with friendly people." The female hijacker also ordered everyone in first class to move back to coach.

It landed at Dawson's Field in Jordan at 6:45 p.m. local time.

Yitzchak Hutner was one of the passengers.

Martha Hodes, an American then 12 who was on this flight with her 13-year-old sister, published her account of the hijacking in 2023. Her book is entitled My Hijacking.

==== Nationalities on Flight 741 ====
Nationality	Passengers	Crew	Total
West Germany	16	2	18
Greece	2	0	2
Israel	55	0	55
India	3	0	3
Italy	1	0	1
Netherlands	1	0	1
United Kingdom	18	0	18
United States	51	9	60
Total	147	11	158

=== Swissair Flight 100 ===
Swissair Flight 100
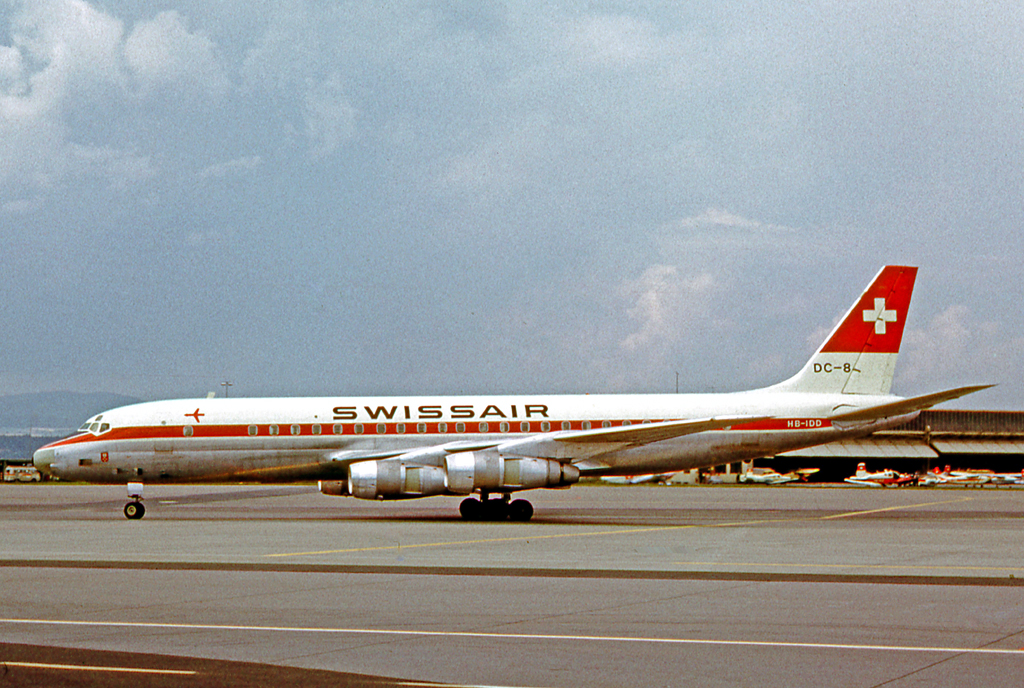
- HB-IDD, the aircraft involved in the hijacking, seen in 1965

Hijacking
- Date: 6 September 1970
- Summary: Hijacking
- Site: Dijon, France

Aircraft
- Aircraft type: Douglas DC-8-53
- Aircraft name: Nidwalden
- Operator: Swissair
- Call sign: SWISSAIR 100
- Registration: HB-IDD
- Flight origin: Zurich Kloten Airport, Zurich, Switzerland
- Destination: John F. Kennedy International Airport, New York, United States
- Occupants: 157 (including 2 hijackers)
- Passengers: 145 (including 2 hijackers)
- Crew: 12
- Fatalities: 0
- Survivors: 157 (including 2 hijackers)

Swissair Flight 100, a Douglas DC-8 registered as HB-IDD and serial number 45656, named Nidwalden, built in 1963, was carrying 145 passengers and 12 crew members from Zürich-Kloten Airport, Switzerland, to John F. Kennedy International Airport, United States. The aircraft was hijacked over France minutes after the TWA flight. A male and a female seized the plane, one of them carrying a silver revolver. An announcement was made over the intercom that the plane had been taken over by the PFLP as it was diverted to Dawson's Field, increasing the hostage number to 306 hostages.

When all the non-Israeli and non-Jewish passengers and crew were released, First Officer Horst Jerosch remained as a captive.

==== Nationalities on Flight 100 ====
Nationality	Passengers	Crew	Total
France	3	0	3
West Germany	25	0	25
Israel	20	0	20
Switzerland	57	10	67
United States	26	0	26
Other	14	2	16
Total	145	12	157

=== Pan Am Flight 93 ===
Pan Am Flight 93
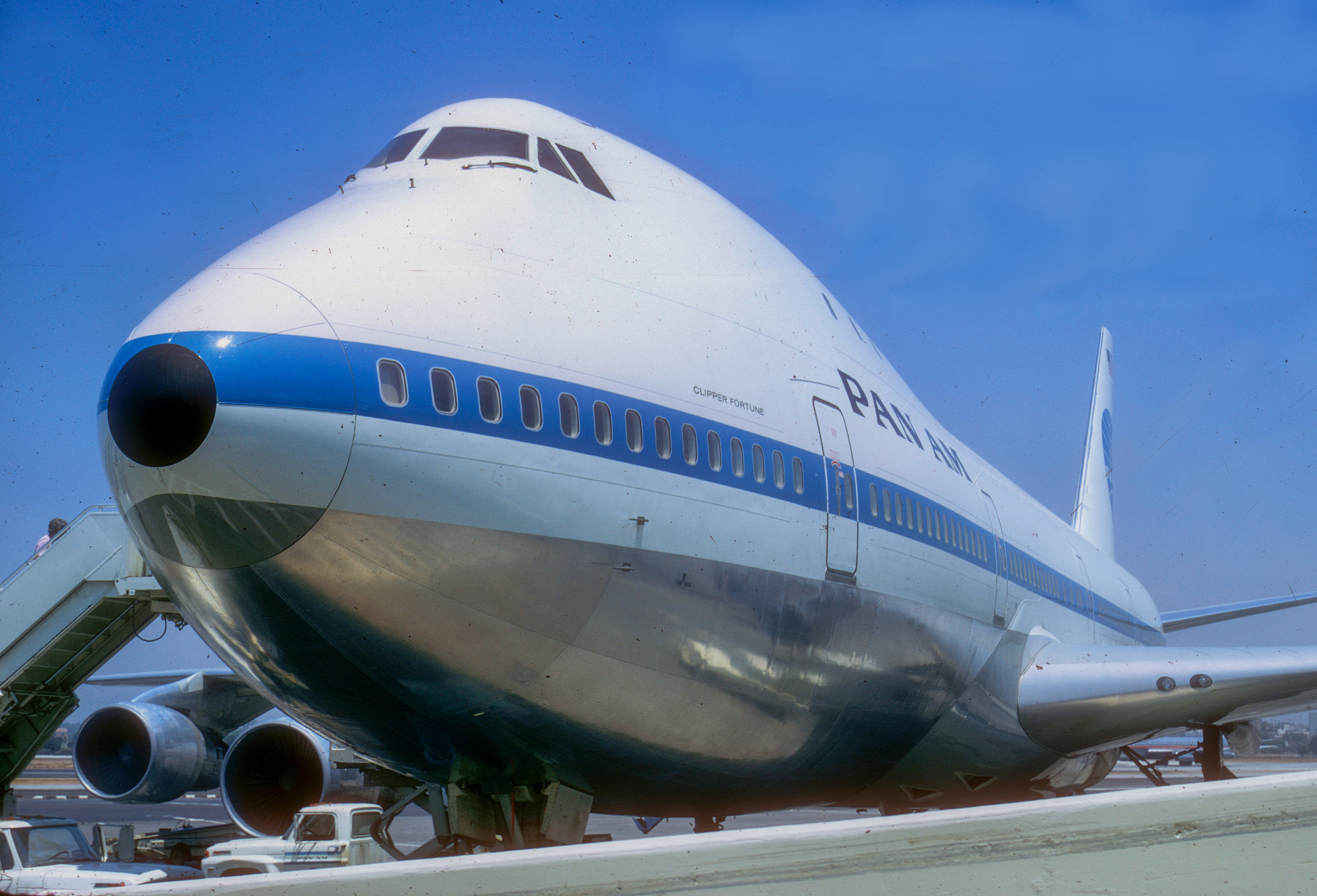
- N752PA, the aircraft involved in the hijacking, seen in August 1970

Hijacking
- Date: 6 September 1970
- Summary: Hijacking
- Site: Cairo

Aircraft
- Aircraft type: Boeing 747–121
- Aircraft name: Clipper Fortune
- Operator: Pan American World Airways
- Call sign: CLIPPER 93
- Registration: N752PA
- Flight origin: Brussels Airport, Brussels, Belgium
- Stopover: Amsterdam Schiphol Airport, Amsterdam, Netherlands
- Destination: John F. Kennedy International Airport, New York, United States
- Occupants: 169 (including 2 hijackers)
- Passengers: 152 (including 2 hijackers)
- Crew: 17
- Fatalities: 0
- Survivors: 169 (including 2 hijackers)

Pan Am Flight 93, a Boeing 747-100 registered as N752PA with serial number 19656, named Clipper Fortune, was carrying 152 passengers and 17 crew, of which 85 were US citizens. The flight originated from Brussels, Belgium, to New York, with a stopover in Amsterdam. The two hijackers bumped from the El Al flight boarded and hijacked this flight as a target of opportunity.

Flight director John Ferruggio recalled,

We were ready for take off in Amsterdam, and the aircraft came to an abrupt stop in the middle of the runway. And Captain Priddy called me up into the cockpit and says, "I'd like to have a word with you." I went up to the cockpit, and he says, "We have two passengers by the name of Diop and Gueye." He says, "Go down and try to find them in the manifest, because I would like to have a word with them." ... So Captain Priddy sat them down at these two seats over here. He gave them a pretty good pat. They had a Styrofoam container in their groin area where they carried the grenade, and the 25-Cal. pistols. But this we found out much later.

The plane first landed in Beirut, where it refueled and picked up several associates of the hijackers, along with enough explosives to destroy the entire plane. It then landed in Cairo after uncertainty whether the Dawson's Field airport could handle the size of the new Boeing 747 jumbo jet. Flight director John Ferruggio, who led the plane's evacuation, is credited with saving the plane's passengers and crew. The plane was blown up at Cairo seconds after it had been evacuated. This was the first hull loss of a Boeing 747. An audio recording of Feruggio's landing instructions to passengers was made by one of them and can be heard in a National Public Radio report. The hijackers were arrested by Egyptian police.

==== Nationalities on Flight 93 ====
Nationality	Passengers	Crew	Total
Belgium	25	0	25
France	25	0	25
West Germany	10	0	10
Indonesia	2	0	2
Israel	2	0	2
Netherlands	35	3	38
Suriname	2	0	2
United Kingdom	2	0	2
United States	71	14	85
Total	152	17	169

=== BOAC Flight 775 ===
BOAC Flight 775
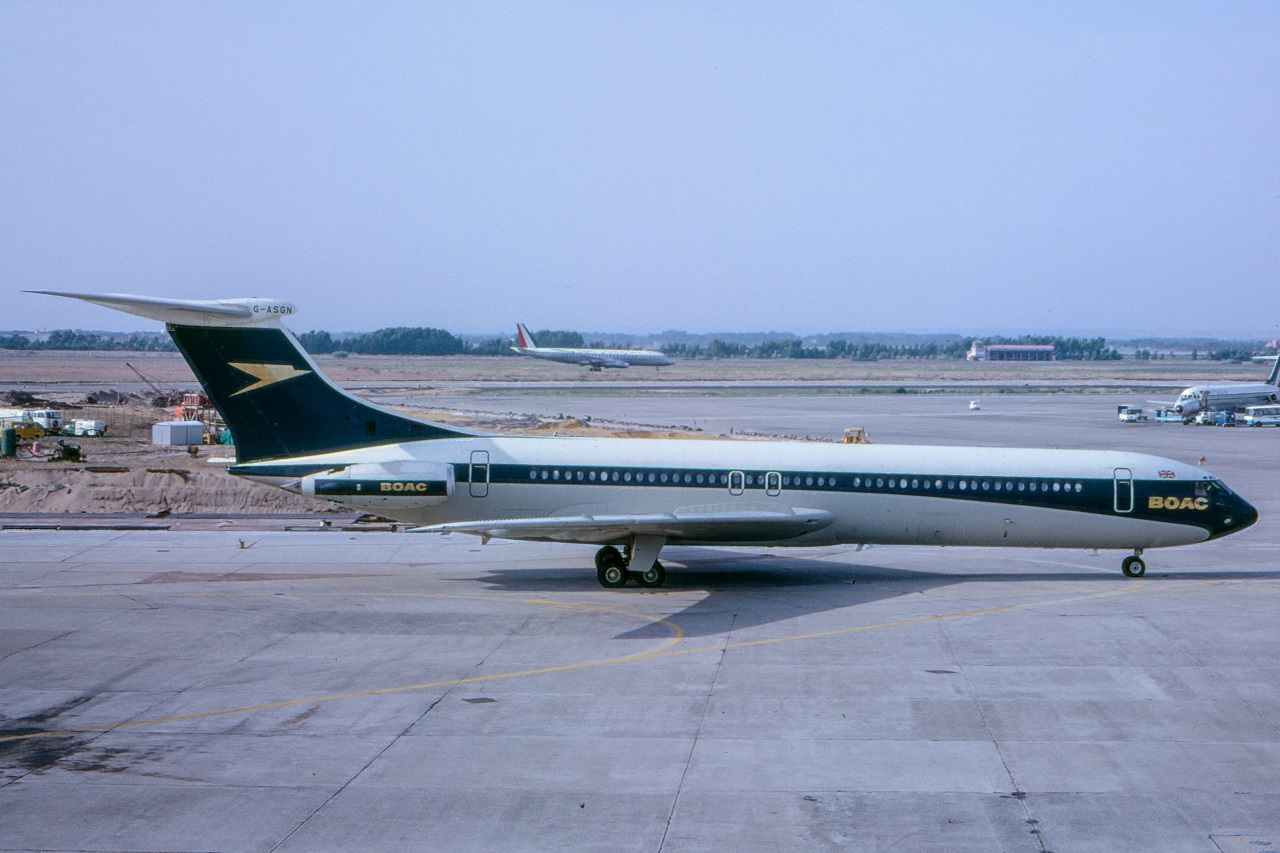
- G-ASGN, the aircraft involved in the hijacking, seen in 1969

Hijacking
- Date: 9 September 1970
- Summary: Hijacking
- Site: Persian Gulf

Aircraft
- Aircraft type: Vickers VC-10-1151
- Operator: British Overseas Airways Corporation
- Call sign: SPEEDBIRD 775
- Registration: G-ASGN
- Flight origin: Sahar International Airport, Bombay, India
- 1st stopover: Bahrain International Airport, Manama, Bahrain
- 2nd stopover: Beirut International Airport, Beirut, Lebanon
- Destination: London Heathrow Airport, London, United Kingdom
- Occupants: 114 (including hijacker)
- Passengers: 105 (including hijacker)
- Crew: 9
- Fatalities: 0
- Survivors: 114 (including hijacker)

On 9 September, a fifth plane, BOAC Flight 775, a Vickers VC10 registered as G-ASGN, flying from Bombay (now Mumbai) to London via Bahrain and Beirut was hijacked after departing Bahrain and forcibly landed at Dawson's Field. This was the work of a PFLP sympathizer who wanted to influence the British government to free Leila Khaled.

Footage of the plane taking off from Beirut for Dawson's Field is in the Pathe News archive.

==== Nationalities on Flight 775 ====
Nationality	Passengers	Crew	Total
Albania	5	0	5
Denmark	15	0	15
France	25	0	25
West Germany	5	0	5
India	4	0	4
United Kingdom	25	9	34
United States	21	0	21
Total	105	9	114

== Hostage accounts ==
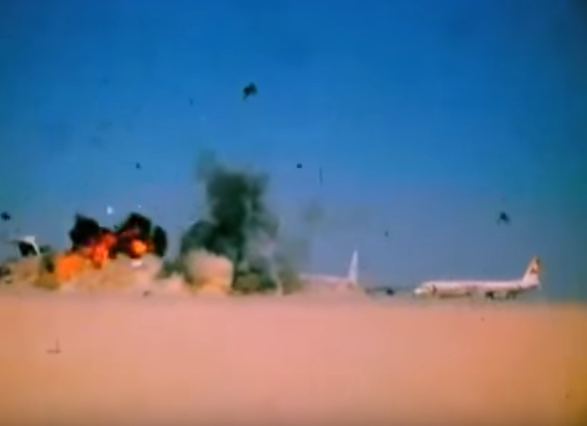
The aircraft being blown up in Dawson's Field on 12 September 1970

Unnamed passengers later recounted their days as hostages.

Unknown speaker 1: "I was held hostage in the front of the plane by the Arabs. They wouldn't believe that I was an American citizen, because they saw my passport that I was in Israel two weeks before. They thought I was connected with the Israeli military, and I was held at gunpoint in front of the plane."

Unknown speaker 2: "Well, then they were told that we were being hijacked to Beirut, which we, we originally were, and everyone was to remain calm and do exactly what they said."

Unknown speaker 3: "I landed at the airport, we got off, and they told the captain that we had three minutes to evacuate; but I didn't think there were still a couple of people on board when they blew the, they blew the front part of the plane up. They had dynamite all over the front and the back of the plane. They brought on 20 kilos of plastic dynamite or something in Beirut."

== Days in the desert ==
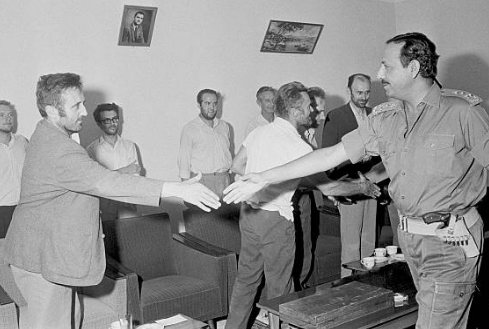
Jordanian Army chief of staff Zaid ibn Shaker checks on the freed hostages, 25 September 1970.

On 7 September 1970, the hijackers held a press conference for 60 members of the media who had made their way to what was being called "Revolution Airport". About 125 hostages were transferred to Amman, while the American, Israeli, Swiss, and West German citizens were held on the planes. Jewish passengers were also held. Passenger Rivke Berkowitz of New York, interviewed in 2006, recalled "the hijackers went around asking people their religion, and I said I was Jewish." Another Jewish hostage, 16-year-old Barbara Mensch (sister of Peter Mensch and sister-in-law of former UK MP Louise Mensch), was told she was "a political prisoner."

As groups of the remaining passengers and crew were assembled on the sand in front of the media, members of the PFLP, among them Bassam Abu Sharif, made statements to the press. Sharif claimed that the goal of the hijackings was "to gain the release of all of our political prisoners jailed in Israel in exchange for the hostages."

In the United States, President Richard Nixon met with his advisers on 8 September and ordered United States Secretary of Defense Melvin Laird to bomb the PFLP positions in Jordan. Laird refused on the pretext that the weather was unfavorable, and the idea was dropped. The 82nd Airborne Division was put on alert, the Sixth Fleet was put to sea, and military aircraft were sent to Turkey in preparation for a possible military strike.

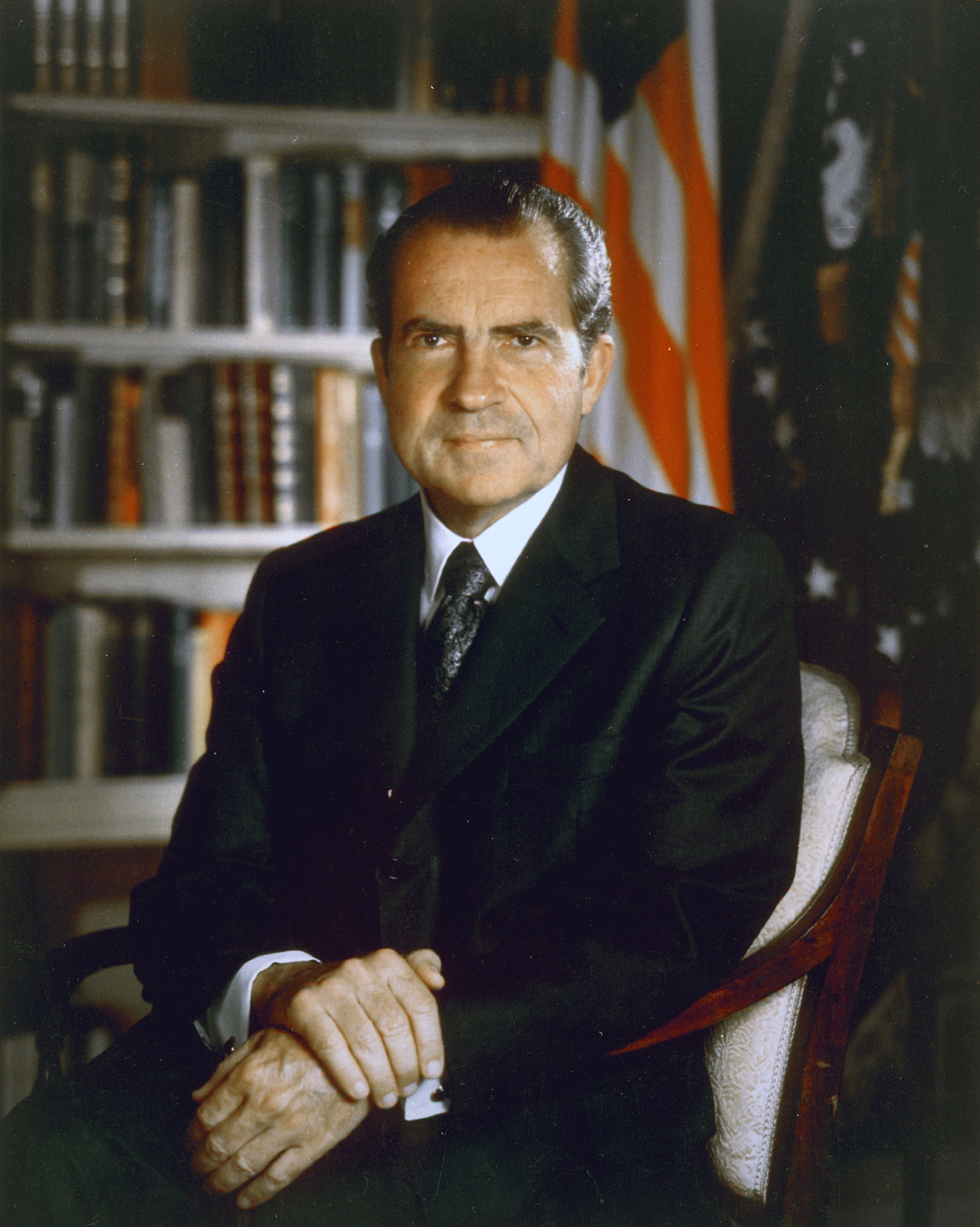
United States President Richard Nixon advised a direct military response to the hijackings.

In contrast, British Prime Minister Edward Heath decided to negotiate with the hijackers, ultimately agreeing to release Khaled and others in exchange for hostages. This was bitterly opposed by the United States:

Tensions between London and Washington are reflected in a bitterly acrimonious telephone conversation between top Foreign Office official Sir Denis Greenhill and senior White House aide Joseph Sisco. ... "I think your government would want to weigh very, very carefully the kind of outcry that would occur in this country against your taking this kind of action." Greenhill replied: "Well, they do, Joe, but there is also an outcry in this country," expressing concern that "Israel won't lift a bloody finger and ... our people get killed. You could imagine how bad that would look, and if it all comes out that we could have got our people out but for the obduracy of you and other people so to speak. ... I mean people say, why the bloody hell didn't you try?"

On 9 September the United Nations Security Council demanded the release of the passengers, in Resolution 286. The following day, fighting between the PFLP and Jordanian forces erupted in Amman at the Intercontinental Hotel, where the 125 women and children were being kept by the PFLP, and the Kingdom appeared to be on the brink of full-scale civil war. The destruction of the aircraft on 12 September highlighted the impotence of the Jordanian government in Palestinian-controlled areas, and the Palestinians declared the city of Irbid to be "liberated territory", in a direct challenge to Hussein's rule.

On 13 September the BBC World Service broadcast a government announcement in Arabic saying that the UK would release Khaled in exchange for the hostages.

According to United States Secretary of State Henry Kissinger, "At this point, whether because [American] readiness measures had given [King Hussein] a psychological lift or because he was reaching the point of desperation, Hussein resolved on an all-out confrontation with the fedayeen."

Complicating the international crisis was the fact that Syria and Iraq, which had links with the USSR, had already threatened to intervene on behalf of Palestinian groups in any confrontation with the Kingdom of Jordan. According to British documents declassified under the "thirty year rule", an anxious King Hussein asked the UK and United States to pass a request to Israel to bomb Syrian troops if they entered Jordan in support of the Palestinians. When a Syrian tank crossed the border, Israeli aircraft overflew the area in warning.

== Resolution and consequences ==
King Hussein declared martial law on 16 September and initiated the military actions later known as the Black September conflict. Hostage David Raab described the Jordanian military actions:

We were in the middle of the shelling since Ashrafiyeh [neighbourhood in Amman] was among the Jordanian Army's primary targets. Electricity was cut off, and again we had little food or water. Friday afternoon, we heard the metal tracks of a tank clanking on the pavement. We were quickly herded into one room, and the guerrillas threw open the doors to make the building appear abandoned so it wouldn't attract fire. Suddenly, the shelling stopped.

About two weeks after the start of the crisis, the remaining hostages were recovered from locations around Amman and exchanged for Leila Khaled and several other PFLP prisoners. The hostages were flown to Cyprus and then to Rome's Leonardo da Vinci Airport, where on 28 September they met President Nixon, who was conducting a State visit to Italy and the Vatican. Speaking to reporters that day, Nixon noted he had told the released captives that:

... as a result of what they had been through... the possibility of reducing hijackings in the future had been substantially increased, because the international community was outraged by these incidents. Now we have not only mobilized guards on our planes, but we are developing facilities ... for the purpose of seeing that people who might be potential hijackers do not get on planes with weapons or explosive material.

During the crisis, on 11 September President Nixon initiated a program to address the problem of "air piracy", including the immediate launch of a group of 100 federal agents to begin serving as armed sky marshals on U.S. flights. Nixon's statement further indicated the U.S. departments of Defense and Transportation would determine whether X-ray devices then available to the military could be moved into civilian service.

The PFLP officially disavowed the tactic of airline hijackings several years later, although several of its members and subgroups continued to hijack aircraft and commit other violent operations.

== Documentary film ==
In 2006, Ilan Ziv described the Dawson's Field hijackings in Hijacked, an hour-long episode of PBS's program American Experience, which he wrote and directed and which originally aired on 26 February 2006. Ziv included archival footage of the events and interviewed hijackers, hostages, members of the media, and politicians.
