= Foreign relations of Guatemala =

Guatemala's major diplomatic interests are regional security and increasingly, regional development and economic integration.

== Diplomatic relations ==
List of countries which Guatemala maintains diplomatic relations with:

| # | Country | Date |
|---|---|---|
| 1 | United States | 4 August 1824 |
| 2 | Colombia | 8 March 1825 |
| 3 | Chile | 15 August 1830 |
| 4 | France | 2 March 1831 |
| 5 | United Kingdom | 12 June 1837 |
| 6 | Costa Rica | 18 August 1839 |
| 7 | Nicaragua | 15 May 1845 |
| 8 | El Salvador | 21 March 1847 |
| 9 | Honduras | 21 March 1847 |
| 10 | Mexico | 6 September 1848 |
| 11 | Belgium | 27 September 1850 |
| 12 | Netherlands | 22 March 1856 |
| 13 | Peru | 20 April 1857 |
| 14 | Spain | 29 May 1863 |
| 15 | Italy | 25 February 1864 |
| 16 | Denmark | 30 April 1880 |
| 17 | Serbia | 1 July 1882 |
| 18 | Portugal | 20 August 1884 |
| 19 | Ecuador | 26 October 1885 |
| — | Venezuela (suspended) | 22 June 1891 |
| 20 | Cuba | 30 April 1902 |
| 21 | Brazil | 22 November 1906 |
| 22 | Switzerland | 14 December 1906 |
| 23 | Uruguay | 16 March 1907 |
| 24 | Paraguay | 1 May 1907 |
| 25 | Argentina | 7 October 1918 |
| 26 | Luxembourg | 7 November 1924 |
| 27 | Czech Republic | 27 February 1927 |
| 28 | Sweden | 9 December 1930 |
| 29 | Poland | 20 January 1934 |
| — | Republic of China (Note: Diplomatic relations established as the Nationalist government on Mainland China. Relations continued on Taiwan, which the ROC took control of from Japan in 1945, after its retreat in 1949. See also One China and Political status of Taiwan.) | 22 December 1934 |
| 30 | Panama | 25 January 1935 |
| 31 | Japan | 20 February 1935 |
| — | Holy See | 11 March 1936 |
| 32 | Norway | 28 April 1939 |
| 33 | Russia | 19 April 1945 |
| 34 | Bolivia | 5 September 1945 |
| 35 | Israel | 15 May 1948 |
| 36 | Haiti | 1948 |
| 37 | Dominican Republic | 31 August 1954 |
| 38 | Austria | 9 September 1955 |
| 39 | Thailand | 7 March 1957 |
| 40 | Turkey | 16 September 1958 |
| — | Sovereign Military Order of Malta | 23 June 1959 |
| 41 | Germany | 9 October 1959 |
| 42 | Canada | 16 September 1961 |
| 43 | South Korea | 24 October 1962 |
| 44 | Greece | 20 July 1966 |
| 45 | Finland | 18 August 1967 |
| 46 | Egypt | 7 September 1970 |
| 47 | Morocco | 15 March 1971 |
| 48 | India | 16 May 1972 |
| 49 | Philippines | 21 June 1972 |
| 50 | Australia | 7 January 1974 |
| 51 | Iraq | 2 February 1978 |
| 52 | Suriname | 9 May 1979 |
| 53 | Bangladesh | 7 October 1983 |
| 54 | Algeria | 31 January 1990 |
| 55 | Jordan | 31 January 1990 |
| 56 | Lebanon | 31 January 1990 |
| 57 | Hungary | 11 October 1990 |
| 58 | Romania | 7 December 1990 |
| 59 | Belize | 11 September 1991 |
| 60 | Jamaica | 11 December 1991 |
| 61 | Barbados | 27 January 1992 |
| 62 | Antigua and Barbuda | 3 February 1992 |
| 63 | Bahamas | 30 March 1992 |
| 64 | Saint Lucia | 1 April 1992 |
| 65 | Indonesia | 29 April 1992 |
| 66 | Guyana | 1 May 1992 |
| 67 | Saint Vincent and the Grenadines | 14 May 1992 |
| 68 | Grenada | 16 July 1992 |
| 69 | Singapore | 1 December 1992 |
| 70 | United Arab Emirates | 15 December 1992 |
| 71 | Cyprus | 17 December 1992 |
| 72 | Croatia | 22 December 1992 |
| 73 | Saint Kitts and Nevis | 1992 |
| 75 | Vietnam | 7 January 1993 |
| 76 | Ukraine | 12 January 1993 |
| 77 | Seychelles | 13 January 1993 |
| 78 | Latvia | 14 January 1993 |
| 79 | Iran | 25 January 1993 |
| 80 | Malaysia | 27 January 1993 |
| 81 | Maldives | 27 January 1993 |
| 82 | Albania | 29 January 1993 |
| 83 | Estonia | 3 February 1993 |
| 84 | Kyrgyzstan | 10 February 1993 |
| 85 | Guinea | 12 February 1993 |
| 86 | Namibia | 19 February 1993 |
| 87 | Belarus | 11 March 1993 |
| 88 | Moldova | 6 April 1993 |
| 89 | Cameroon | 14 April 1993 |
| 90 | Slovakia | 15 April 1993 |
| 91 | Federated States of Micronesia | 13 May 1993 |
| 92 | Iceland | 5 August 1993 |
| 93 | Oman | 13 October 1993 |
| 94 | Slovenia | 25 November 1993 |
| 95 | Lithuania | 14 December 1993 |
| 96 | Bulgaria | 14 January 1994 |
| 97 | Trinidad and Tobago | 25 May 1994 |
| 98 | Ghana | 26 September 1994 |
| 99 | Azerbaijan | 1 November 1994 |
| 100 | South Africa | 12 January 1995 |
| 101 | Benin | 14 November 1995 |
| 102 | Andorra | 27 November 1995 |
| 103 | Malta | 11 December 1995 |
| 104 | Kuwait | 12 December 1995 |
| 105 | Cambodia | 26 February 1996 |
| 106 | Turkmenistan | 22 August 1996 |
| 107 | Mozambique | 4 February 1997 |
| 108 | Armenia | 29 June 1998 |
| 109 | New Zealand | 27 October 1998 |
| 110 | North Macedonia | 16 November 2001 |
| 111 | Nigeria | December 2001 |
| 112 | San Marino | 14 February 2002 |
| 113 | Brunei | 30 June 2004 |
| 114 | Ireland | 2004 |
| 115 | Mongolia | 3 July 2006 |
| 116 | Mali | 7 July 2006 |
| 117 | Burkina Faso | 21 July 2006 |
| 118 | Cape Verde | 25 July 2006 |
| 119 | Nepal | 8 August 2006 |
| 120 | Tajikistan | 20 August 2006 |
| 121 | Gambia | 5 September 2006 |
| 122 | Mauritius | 7 September 2006 |
| 123 | Montenegro | 27 September 2006 |
| 124 | Nauru | 6 December 2006 |
| 125 | Equatorial Guinea | 8 December 2006 |
| 126 | Uzbekistan | 9 February 2007 |
| 127 | Qatar | 27 February 2007 |
| 128 | Zimbabwe | 2 March 2007 |
| 129 | Tunisia | 19 March 2007 |
| 130 | Botswana | 7 May 2007 |
| 131 | Bahrain | 21 May 2007 |
| 132 | Libya | 5 September 2007 |
| 133 | Samoa | 20 September 2007 |
| 134 | North Korea | 26 September 2007 |
| 135 | Monaco | 2 November 2007 |
| 136 | Niger | 13 November 2007 |
| 137 | Laos | 20 February 2008 |
| 138 | Kenya | 25 September 2008 |
| 139 | Bosnia and Herzegovina | 9 January 2009 |
| 140 | Dominica | 12 August 2009 |
| 141 | Georgia | 27 April 2010 |
| 142 | Solomon Islands | 8 March 2011 |
| 143 | Tuvalu | 20 May 2011 |
| 144 | Kazakhstan | 2 September 2011 |
| 145 | Pakistan | 14 October 2011 |
| 146 | Ethiopia | 20 June 2012 |
| 147 | Sri Lanka | 26 February 2013 |
| 148 | Zambia | 19 March 2013 |
| 149 | Fiji | 13 September 2013 |
| 150 | Ivory Coast | 13 March 2014 |
| 151 | Senegal | 29 September 2015 |
| 152 | Liechtenstein | 22 December 2015 |
| 153 | Saudi Arabia | 21 April 2017 |
| 154 | Marshall Islands | 20 July 2017 |
| 155 | Djibouti | 28 February 2018 |
| 156 | Gabon | 31 December 2022 |
| 157 | Palau | 19 January 2023 |
| 158 | Timor-Leste | 3 April 2023 |
| 159 | Angola | 22 September 2023 |
| 160 | Togo | 22 September 2023 |
| 161 | Rwanda | 24 September 2024 |
| 162 | Kiribati | 4 October 2024 |
| 163 | Vanuatu | 4 October 2024 |
| 164 | Mauritania | 24 September 2026 |

== Bilateral relations ==
=== Americas ===
| Country | Formal Relations Began | Notes |
|---|---|---|
| Belize | 11 September 1993 | See Belize–Guatemala relations Guatemala has a longstanding claim to a large portion of Belize. The territorial dispute caused problems with the United Kingdom and later with Belize following its 1981 independence from the UK. In December 1989, Guatemala sponsored Belize for permanent observer status in the Organization of American States (OAS). In September 1991 Guatemala recognized Belize's independence and established diplomatic ties, while acknowledging that the boundaries remained in dispute. In anticipation of an effort to bring the border dispute to an end in early 1996, the Guatemalan Congress ratified two long-pending international agreements governing frontier issues and maritime rights. In early 2000 the Guatemalan Foreign Ministry proposed a border settlement that would transfer more than half of Belize's territory to Guatemala. Following a spate of border incidents, both sides agreed during talks under OAS auspices in November 2000 to confidence-building measures to reduce tensions. They followed that with an agreement on opening substantive discussions on the dispute. Both Guatemala and Belize are participating in the confidence-building measures, including the Guatemala-Belize Language Exchange Project. In September 2010, the Guatemalan Congress overwhelmingly gave its approval for a referendum to be held; giving the people of Guatemala a say in whether or not that country's claim to Belize should be taken to the International Court of Justice. Under the special agreement (compromise) signed in December 2008 by Belize and Guatemala it was agreed that if the people of both nations approved, by way of a simultaneous referendum on the same day, that the dispute would proceed to the ICJ. The outcome of any ruling handed down by the ICJ will be final and binding, regardless of in whose favor the ruling is handed down. |
| Canada | 16 September 1961 | See Canada–Guatemala relations: Canada has an embassy in Guatemala City.; Guatemala has an embassy in Ottawa and a consulates-general in Montreal, Toronto and Vancouver. |
| Chile | 8 August 1840 | See Chile–Guatemala relations: Chile has an embassy in Guatemala City.; Guatemala has an embassy in Santiago de Chile. |
| Colombia | 8 March 1825 | See Colombia–Guatemala relations: Colombia has an embassy in Guatemala City.; Guatemala has an embassy in Bogotá. |
| Costa Rica | 18 August 1839 | See Costa Rica–Guatemala relations: Costa Rica has an embassy in Guatemala City.; Guatemala has an embassy in San José. |
| Cuba | 30 April 1902 | See Cuba–Guatemala relations: Cuba has an embassy in Guatemala City.; Guatemala has an embassy in Havana. |
| El Salvador | 21 March 1821 | See El Salvador–Guatemala relations: El Salvador has an embassy in Guatemala City.; Guatemala has an embassy in San Salvador. |
| Mexico | 6 September 1838 | See Guatemala–Mexico relations; Guatemalan immigration to Mexico Diplomatic relations between Mexico and Guatemala began in 1838 after the dissolution of the Federal Republic of Central America.: Guatemala has an embassy in Mexico City and consulates-general in Cancún, Monterrey, Oaxaca City, San Luis Potosí, Tapachula, Tenosique, Tijuana, and Tuxtla Gutiérrez; consulates in Acayucan, Ciudad Hidalgo, Comitán and a consular office in Arriaga.; Mexico has an embassy in Guatemala City and consulates in Flores, Quetzaltenango and in Tecún Umán.; Both countries are members of the Organization of American States, Organization of Ibero-American States, and the Rio Group. |
| Nicaragua | 15 May 1845 | Both countries established diplomatic relations on 15 May 1845.: Guatemala has an embassy in Managua.; Nicaragua closed its embassy in Guatemala City in 2024. |
| Panama | 25 January 1935 | Guatemala has an embassy in Panama City.; Panama has an embassy in Guatemala City. |
| Paraguay | 1 May 1907 | Guatemala is accredited to Paraguay from its embassy in Buenos Aires, Argentina.; Paraguay is accredited to Guatemala from its embassy in Mexico City, Mexico. |
| Peru | 1857 | See Guatemala–Peru relations: Guatemala has an embassy in Lima.; Peru has an embassy in Guatemala City. |
| Haiti | 1948 | See Guatemala–Haiti relations: Haiti has a diplomatic consulate in Guatemala City.; Guatemala has a diplomatic consulate in Port-au-Prince. |
| Honduras | 1821 | See Guatemala–Honduras relations Both countries established diplomatic relations in 1821.: Guatemala has an embassy in Tegucigalpa and a consulate in San Pedro Sula.; Honduras has an embassy in Guatemala. |
| United States | 4 August 1824 | See Guatemala–United States relations Relations between the United States and Guatemala traditionally have been close, although at times strained by human rights and civil-military issues. U.S. policy objectives in Guatemala include: Supporting the institutionalization of democracy and implementation of the Peace Accords; Encouraging respect for human rights and the rule of law, and implementation of the International Commission against Impunity in Guatemala (CICIG); Supporting broad-based economic growth and sustainable development and maintaining mutually beneficial trade and commercial relations, including ensuring that benefits of Dominican Republic–Central America Free Trade Agreement (CAFTA-DR) reach all sectors of the Guatemalan populace; Cooperating to combat money laundering, corruption, narcotics trafficking, alien-smuggling, and other transnational crime; Supporting Central American integration through support for resolution of border/territorial disputes; Guatemala has an embassy in Washington, D.C. and several consulates-general throughout the country.; United States has an embassy in Guatemala City. |
| Uruguay | 16 March 1907 | See Guatemala–Uruguay relations: Guatemala has an embassy in Montevideo.; Uruguay has an embassy in Guatemala City. |
| Venezuela | 31 October 1890 | Main article: Guatemala–Venezuela relations: Guatemalan President Alejandro Giammattei announced it would sever ties with Venezuela, prompting to close its embassy both in Caracas and Guatemala City, following the ongoing presidential crisis. |

=== Asia ===
| Country | Formal Relations Began | Notes |
|---|---|---|
| Armenia | 29 June 1998 | Armenia is accredited to Guatemala through its embassy in Mexico City, Mexico.; Guatemala is accredited to Armenia through its embassy in Moscow, Russia. |
| Azerbaijan | 1 November 1994 | Azerbaijan is accredited to Guatemala through its embassy in Mexico City, Mexico.; Guatemala is accredited to Azerbaijan through its embassy in Ankara, Turkey. |
| Republic of China (Taiwan) | 15 June 1933 | See Guatemala–Taiwan relations: As of March 2023, Guatemala is one of 13 nations who recognize the legitimacy of the Republic of China (ROC) on Taiwan under the One China policy.; The ROC has an embassy in Guatemala City.; Guatemala has an embassy in Taipei. |
| India | 16 May 1972 | See Guatemala–India relations: India maintains an embassy in Guatemala City.; Guatemala has an embassy in New Delhi. |
| Indonesia | 29 April 1992 | Indonesia is accredited to Guatemala from its embassy in Mexico City, Mexico.; Guatemala has an embassy in Jakarta. |
| Israel | 15 May 1948 | See Guatemala–Israel relations Dinner hosted by Israeli Ambassador to Guatemala Joshua Shai, in honor of President of Guatemala Enrique Peralta Azurdia, at his residence in Guatemala, 1964.: Israel maintains an embassy in Guatemala City.; Guatemala has an embassy in Jerusalem.; In May 2018, Guatemala was the second country after the United States to move its embassy from Tel Aviv to Jerusalem. The first COVID vaccines to arrive in Guatemala were received from donations sent by Israel. |
| South Korea | 24 October 1962 | Guatemala has an embassy in Seoul, South Korea.; South Korea has an embassy in Guatemala City. |
| Thailand | 3 March 1957 | Guatemala has an embassy in Bangkok.; Thailand is accredited to Guatemala through its embassy in Mexico City, Mexico. |
| Turkey | 18 July 1874 | See Guatemala–Turkey relations: Guatemala has an embassy in Ankara and an honorary consulate in Istanbul.; Turkey has an embassy in Guatemala City.; Trade volume between the two countries was US$63.5 million in 2019 (Guatemalan exports/imports: 10/53.5 million USD). |

=== Europe ===
| Country | Formal Relations Began | Notes |
|---|---|---|
| France | 2 March 1831 | France has an embassy in Guatemala City.; Guatemala has an embassy in Paris. |
| Germany | 1959 | See Germany–Guatemala relations: Germany has an embassy in Guatemala City; Guatemala has an embassy in Berlin |
| Russia | 19 April 1945 | See Guatemala–Russia relations: Guatemala has an embassy in Moscow.; Russia has an embassy in Guatemala City. |
| Spain | 29 May 1863 | See Guatemala–Spain relations: Guatemala has an embassy in Madrid.; Spain has an embassy in Guatemala City. |
| United Kingdom | 12 July 1837 | See Guatemala–United Kingdom relations British Foreign Office Minister Hugo Swire with Guatemalan Foreign Minister Carlos Raúl Morales in London, November 2014. Guatemala established diplomatic relations with the United Kingdom on 12 July 1837.: Guatemala maintains an embassy in London.; United Kingdom is accredited to Guatemala from its embassy in Guatemala City.; Both countries share common membership of the Atlantic Co-operation Pact, the International Criminal Court, the United Nations, and the World Trade Organization, as well as the Central America–UK Association Agreement. |

=== Oceania ===
| Country | Formal Relations Began | Notes |
|---|---|---|
| Australia | | There are four Australia–Guatemala bilateral treaties. Guatemala has an embassy in Canberra, Australia. The Australian embassy in Mexico has consular responsibility for Guatemala. Trade between the two countries is A$32 Million. |

== See also ==
- Belizean–Guatemalan territorial dispute
- List of ambassadors of Guatemala
- List of diplomatic missions in Guatemala
- List of diplomatic missions of Guatemala
- Visa requirements for Guatemalan citizens
