= Russian Guatemalan =

Russian Guatemalan ruso-guatemalteco
- (Russia) (Guatemala)

Regions with significant populations
- Guatemala City, Zacapa and Antigua Guatemala

Languages
- Spanish, Russian

Religion
- Russian Orthodox Christianity, other Christian, Islam and Judaism

Related ethnic groups
- Russian people, Demographics of Guatemala

Russian Guatemalans are Guatemalan citizens who have full or partial Russian ancestry.

== History ==
The first Russian immigrants arrived in Guatemala in the late 1890s. Some Russians had already settled in Mexico. However, some immigrants preferred to go to Guatemala or Nicaragua because Porfirio Diaz was the president of Mexico. Also, some immigrants were socialist politicians who had good relations with Manuel Estrada Cabrera, who became President of Guatemala in 1898. The Russian immigration at this time, though, was insignificant. Many refugees of Russian, Greek, and Polish origin came after the First World War.

=== Russian Orthodox missions in Guatemala ===
In the late nineteenth century, some Orthodox Christian immigrants from the Levant came to Guatemala. In the early twentieth century, a wave of German immigrants and a smaller but still present wave of Russians and Greek, arrived in Guatemala. These Orthodox Christians settled with their families in Guatemala and preserved their Orthodox faith and traditions.

=== Communist influence ===

During the government of Jacobo Arbenz, there was communist influence in Guatemala. This was carried out in part through the arrival of Soviet agents who came to Guatemala to create a communist core, a phenomenon that also occurred in other Latin American countries. The arrival of Communists revolutionaries like Ernesto Guevara also increased the influence of communists in Guatemala at this time. Communism was attractive for some Guatemalan politicians who had relations with Russia. Communism's greatest influence, though, was to poor people because communism was intended to eliminate private property and take away land from the United Fruit Company.

The CIA twice attempted to overthrow Jacobo Arbenz from power. The first attempt was a failure, but the second attempt successfully placed Carlos Castillo Armas in charge. Armas returned the land to the Guatemalan landholdings and the United Fruit Company. Through the overthrow of Arbenz, the relations between Russia and Guatemala were almost dissolved, although the relations would see a resurgence during the Cold War. In the 1990s, many retired soldiers left Russia to go to Guatemala and start a new life.

== Russian influence in the art and culture of Guatemala ==
The National Ballet of Guatemala emerged in 1948, led by the grandmaster Kiril Pikieris, and the Belgians Marcelle Bonge de Devaux and her husband Jean Devaux, both of whom were World War II refugees). Between 1949 and 1954, the Ballet of Guatemala was directed by the Russian master Kachurovski Leonide with his wife Marie Tchernova, who was also in charge of the National School of Dance. When the United States overthrew the government of Jacobo Arbenz, the Ballet of Guatemala was abolished because the Liberacionista Governing Board accused the Russian directors of being communists.

On March 19, 1955, President Carlos Castillo Armas created the advisory committee of the Department of Fine Arts and Cultural Extension, which advised the School of Dance, with the intention of restarting the ballet in Guatemala directed by Claire Denis Carey and Joop Van Allen.

At the end of the Cold War, a group of Germans and Russians introduced the Russian tradition of performing the Nutcracker. The work is presented annually in December at the Centro Cultural Miguel Ángel Asturias.

== See also ==
- Russians
- Guatemala–Russia relations
- Immigration to Guatemala
