= Guatemala–India relations =

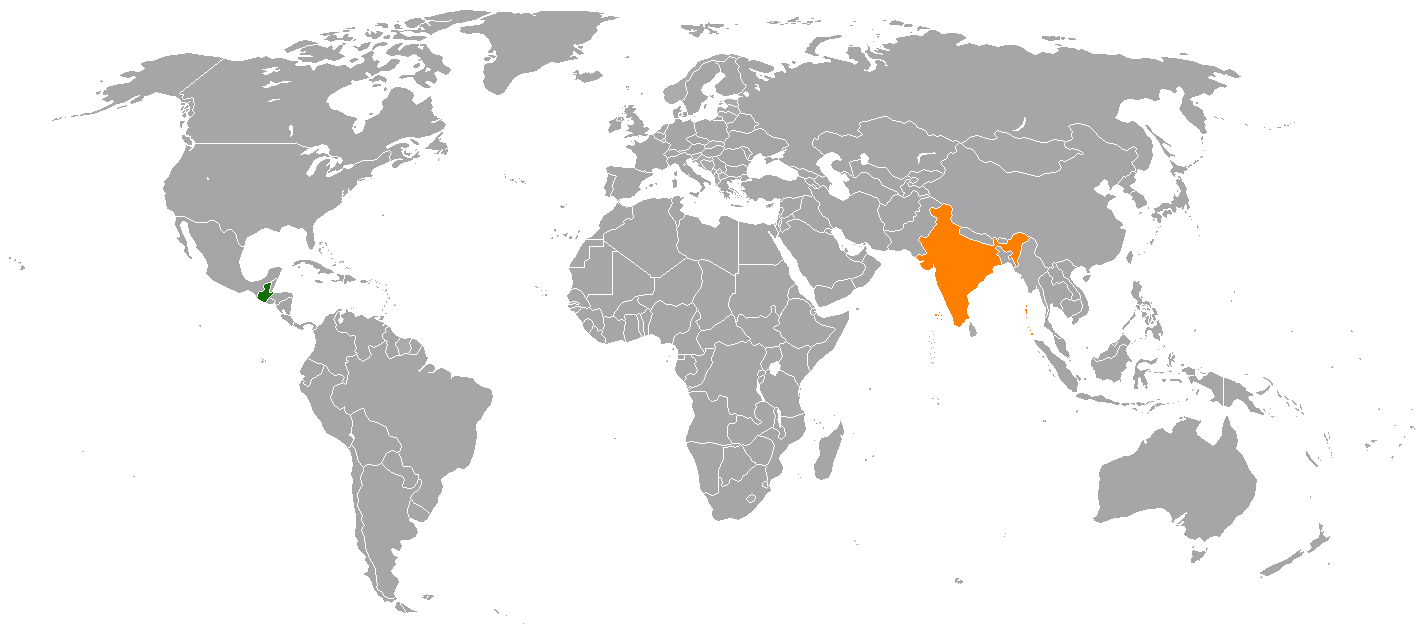
- Guatemala: India

India and Guatemala established diplomatic relations with each other in the 1970s, and have decided to open resident missions in the other country.

Both nations are part of the Non-Aligned Movement.

== History ==
According to the Ministry of Commerce of the Government of India, total trade between India and Guatemala was worth just $92 million in 2009–10, with India accounting for nearly $87 million worth of the trade or around 95%.

Vice President of India, Venkaiah Naidu visited Guatemala in its first high level delegation visit to the country since establishing diplomatic relations in 1972. The Vice President visited the historic city of Antigua Guatemala and also discussed about expanding trade ties in the field of culture, wildlife preservation, IT sector and agriculture. He also emphasized on helping the Guatemalan healthcare system with the aid of the pharmaceutical industry back in India.

== Diplomatic missions ==
India opened its embassy in Guatemala City on 2 May 2011. Guatemala opened its embassy in New Delhi on 9 April 2013.

== Spice war ==
There is increased competition between in the production of cardamom between India and Guatemala, among other spices. Some sources have referred to this as a "spice war."

== Illegal immigration ==
Due to the visa-free entry that Guatemala offers to Indian citizens, there has been a report in the India Today magazine that a human trafficking network operates, which transports people from India to the United States, by first flying to Istanbul and then travelling on to Guatemala and finally to Texas.

== See also ==
- Foreign relations of Guatemala
- Foreign relations of India
