= Guatemala–Taiwan relations =

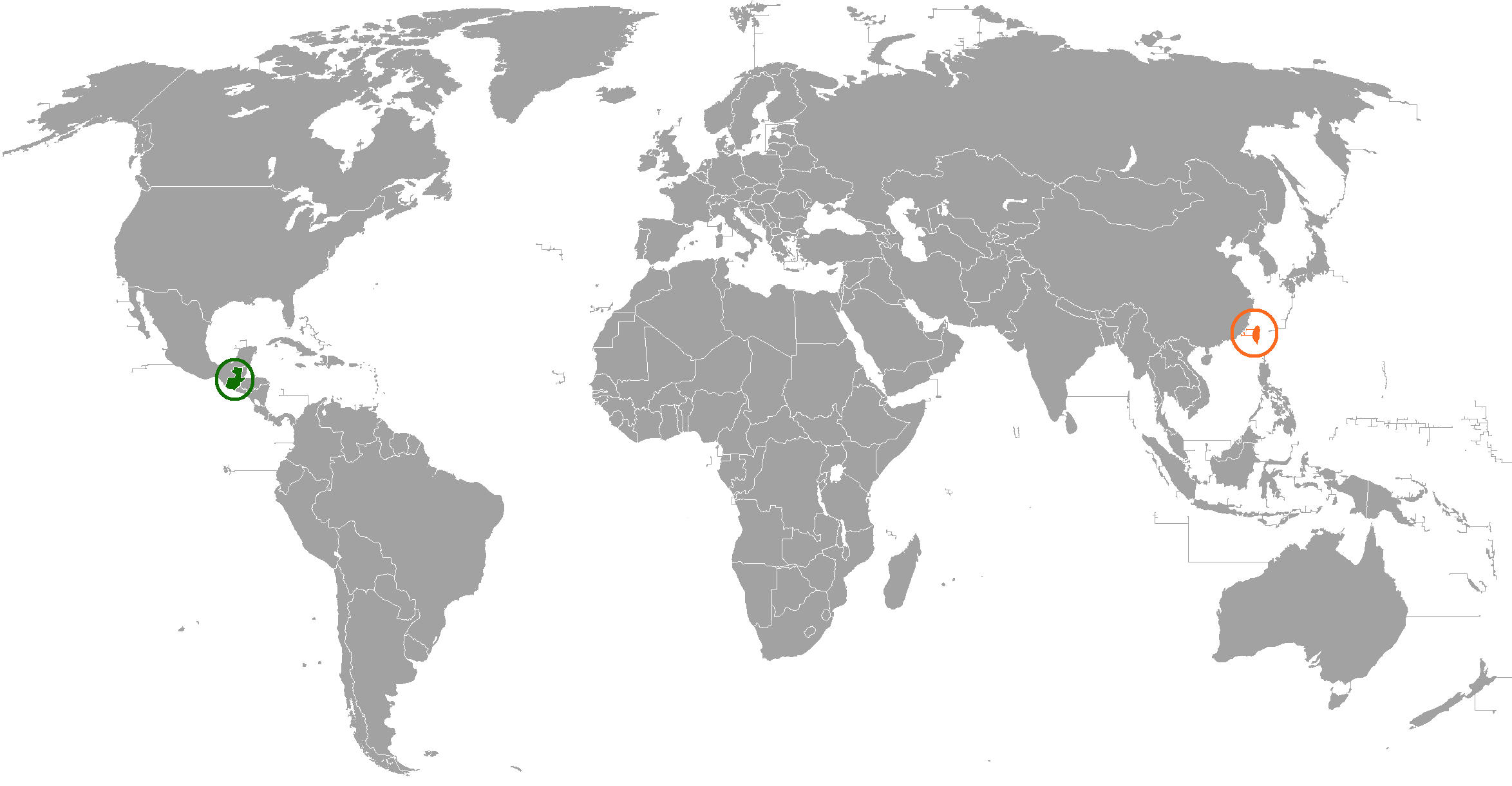
- Guatemala: Taiwan

Guatemala and the Republic of China (ROC, Taiwan) established bilateral relations in 1933. Following the ROC's relocation to Taiwan, Guatemala has maintained diplomatic relations with the ROC rather than the mainland People's Republic of China. As of 2024, Guatemala is one of 11 nations to formally recognize Taiwan, and the oldest contuining nation to do so.

== History ==
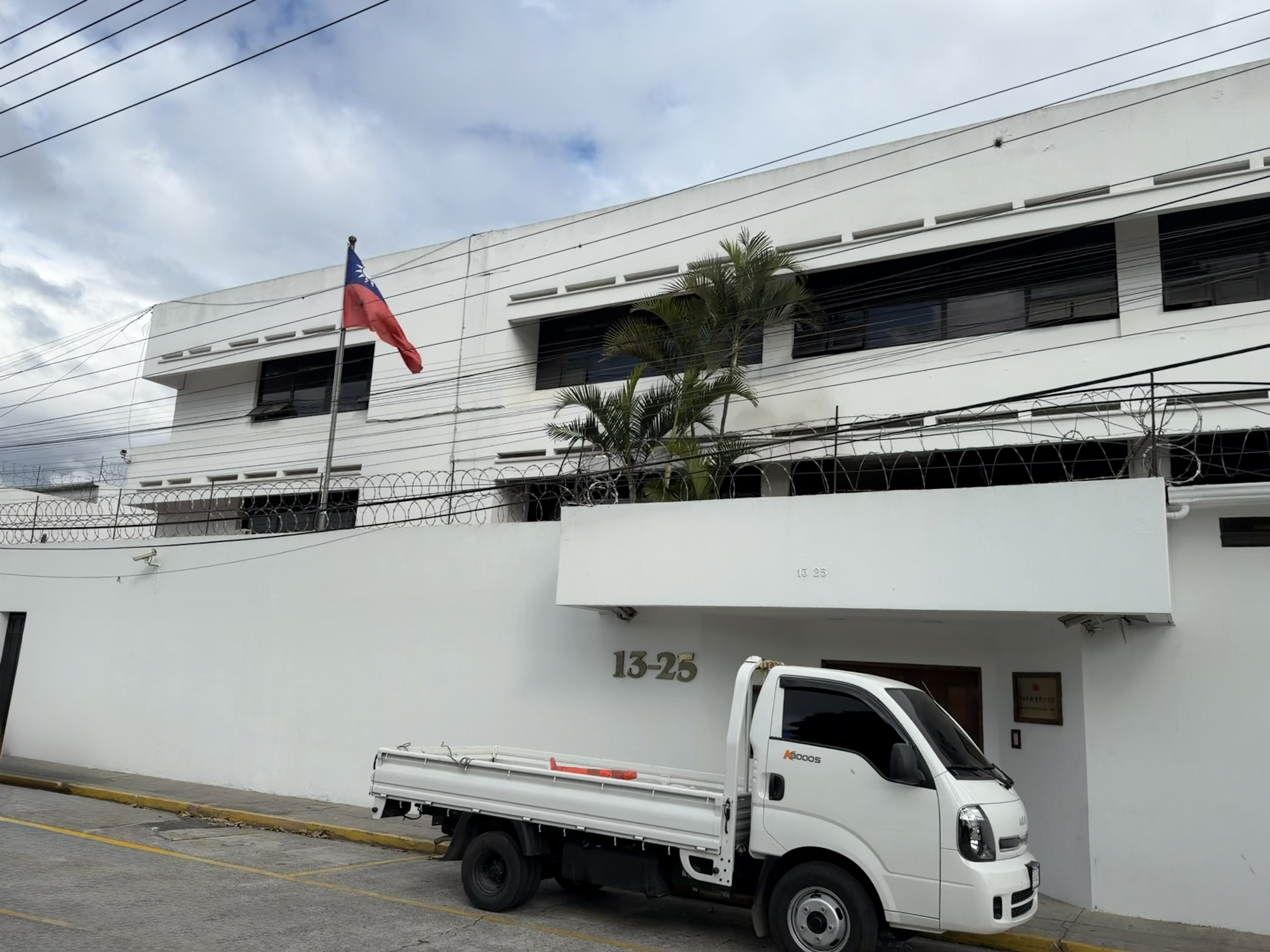
Embassy of Taiwan in Guatemala City

On 18 March 2014, Guatemala's former president Alfonso Portillo pled guilty in the Federal District Court in Manhattan to a charge that he accepted bribes in exchange for recognizing the Republic of China (ROC). President Pérez Molina said that Guatemala's relations with the ROC were and are strong and that the Portillo confession would not affect diplomatic relations between the two nations. Taiwan's Ministry of Foreign Affairs declined comment.

In 2015, Vice President Juan Alfonso Fuentes Soria visited Taiwan and met with President Ma Ying-jeou.

In 2022, Guatemalan foreign minister Mario Bucaro said that relations between the two countries were strong.

In May 2023, President Tsai Ing-wen traveled to Guatemala and met with President Alejandro Giammattei at Tikal Temple I. Her visit was protested by China.

In April 2023, Giammattei visited Taiwan. China placed pressure on Guatemala before the visit and protested after the visit.

== Agriculture ==
Taiwan has supported rural development in Guatemala.

== Healthcare ==
Taiwan has given $22m USD to help build a new hospital in Chimaltenango.

== See also ==
- Foreign relations of Guatemala
- Foreign relations of Taiwan
