= List of ambassadors of Guatemala =

This is an incomplete list of Ambassadors and High Commissioners of Guatemala. High Commissioners represent member states of the Commonwealth of Nations and ambassadors represent other states. Note that some diplomats are accredited by, or to, more than one country.

== Current ambassadors as of August 2018 ==
Host country	Appointed	Location of resident embassy	Ambassador	List	Embassy website
Holy See	2016	Rome	Alfredo Vásquez Rivera	List	
Italy	2018	Rome	Karla Gabriela Samayoa Recari	List	

== See also ==
- Foreign relations of Guatemala
- List of diplomatic missions of Guatemala
