= Cuba–Guatemala relations =

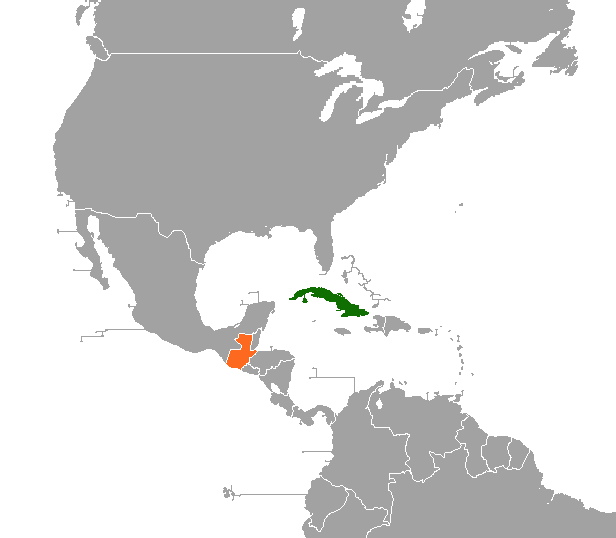

- Cuba: Guatemala

The Republic of Cuba and the Republic of Guatemala maintain bilateral relations. Both nations are members of the Association of Caribbean States, Community of Latin American and Caribbean States, Organization of Ibero-American States and the United Nations.

== History ==
In the 1960s, Cuba established close ties with the emerging Guatemalan social movement led by Luis Augusto Turcios Lima, and supported the establishment of the URNG, a militant organization which later evolved to become a legal political party following the end of the Guatemalan Civil War. Guatemala severed ties with Cuba from the 1960s until the end of the civil war in 1998. In 1999, Guatemalan President Alvaro Arzu visited Cuba.

In 2009, Guatemalan President Alvaro Colom visited Havana and gave Fidel Castro the Order of Quetzal, one of the highest honors in Guatemala. Cuban president Raúl Castro accepted the award on behalf of his brother, Fidel.

== Medical aid ==
Cuba provided over 40,000 eye surgeries and 27 million medical consultations to Guatemalans between 1998 and 2009.

== Trade ==
In FY2020, Guatemala exported US$8.86 Million worth of goods to Cuba while Cuba exported US$389,000 worth of goods to Guatemala. Guatemala's most common export to Cuba was cleaning products while Cuba's most common export to Guatemala was Coal Brisquettes.

== Resident diplomatic missions ==
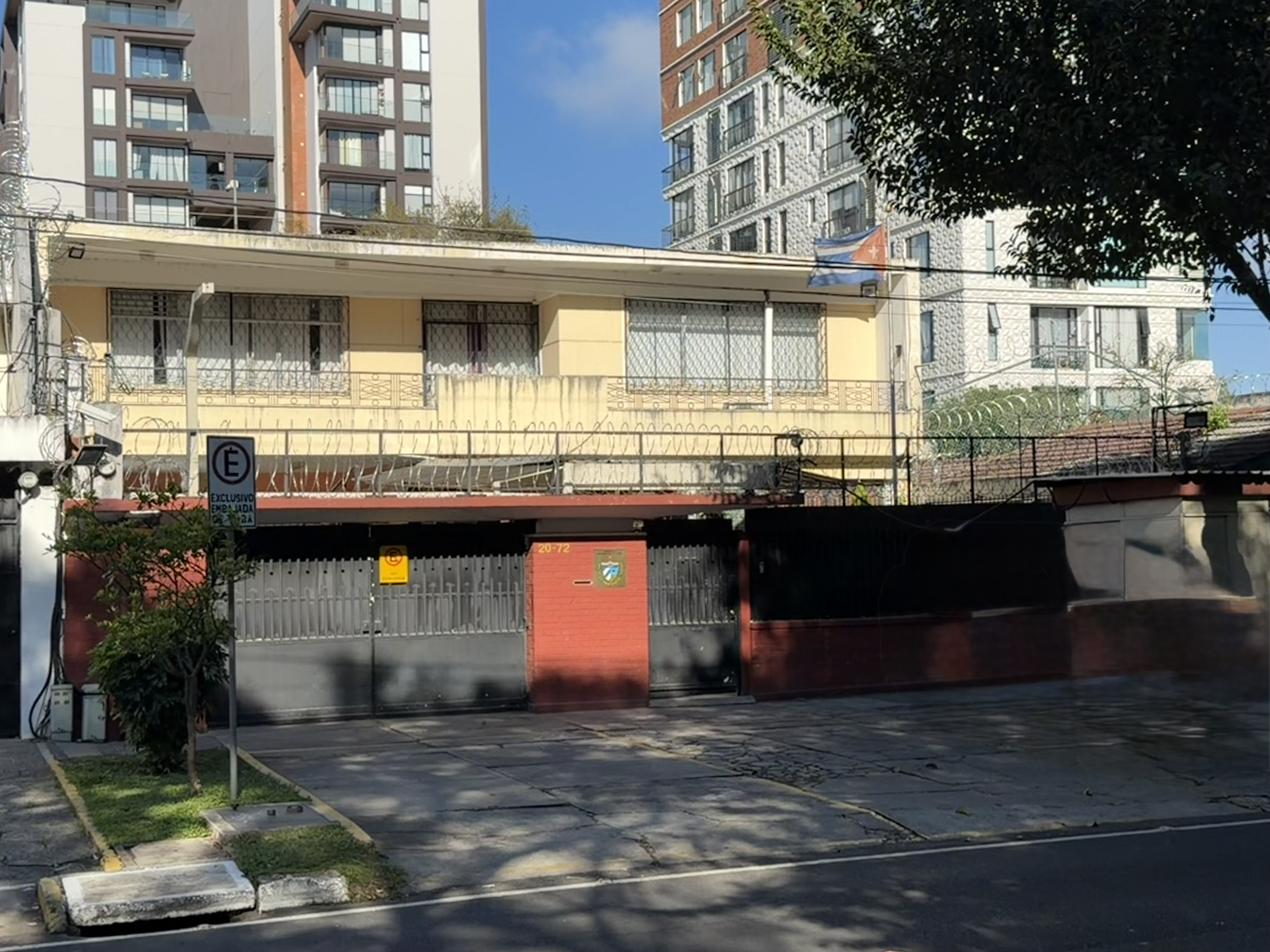
Embassy of Cuba in Guatemala City

- Cuba has an embassy in Guatemala City.
- Guatemala has an embassy in Havana.

== See also ==
- Foreign relations of Cuba
- Foreign relations of Guatemala
