= List of diplomatic missions in Guatemala =

This is a list of diplomatic missions in Guatemala. There are currently 35 embassies in Guatemala City.

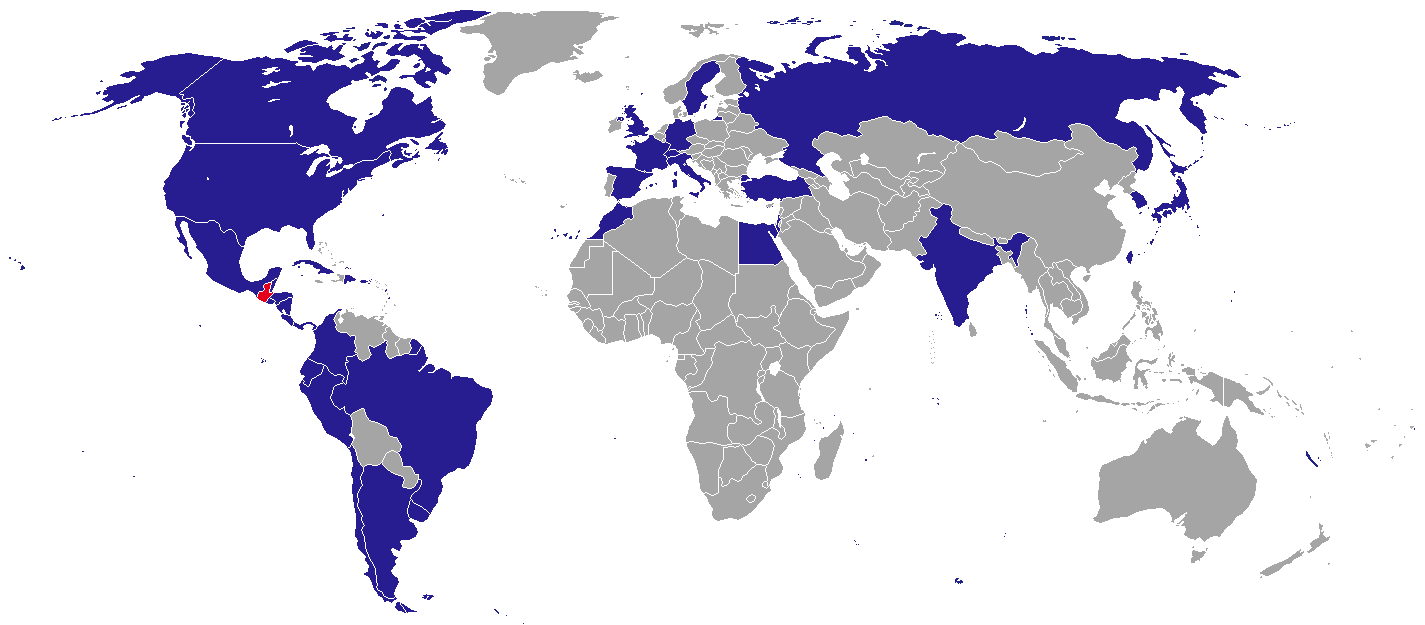
Map of diplomatic missions in Guatemala

== Diplomatic missions in Guatemala City ==
=== Embassies ===
1. Argentina
2. Belize
3. Brazil
4. Canada
5. Chile
6. Republic of China
7. Colombia
8. Costa Rica
9. Cuba
10. Dominican Republic
11. Ecuador
12. Egypt
13. El Salvador
14. France
15. Germany
16. Holy See
17. Honduras
18. India
19. Israel
20. Italy
21. Japan
22. Mexico
23. Morocco
24. Panama
25. Peru
26. Russia
27. South Korea
28. Sovereign Military Order of Malta
29. Spain
30. Sweden
31. Switzerland
32. Turkey
33. United Kingdom
34. United States
35. Uruguay

=== Other missions/delegations ===
1. European Union (Delegation)
2. Organization of American States (Office)

== Consular missions ==
=== Ayutla (Tecún Umán) ===
- Mexico (Consulate)

=== Flores (Petén Department) ===
- Mexico (Consulate)

=== Quetzaltenango ===
- Mexico (Consulate)

== Gallery ==
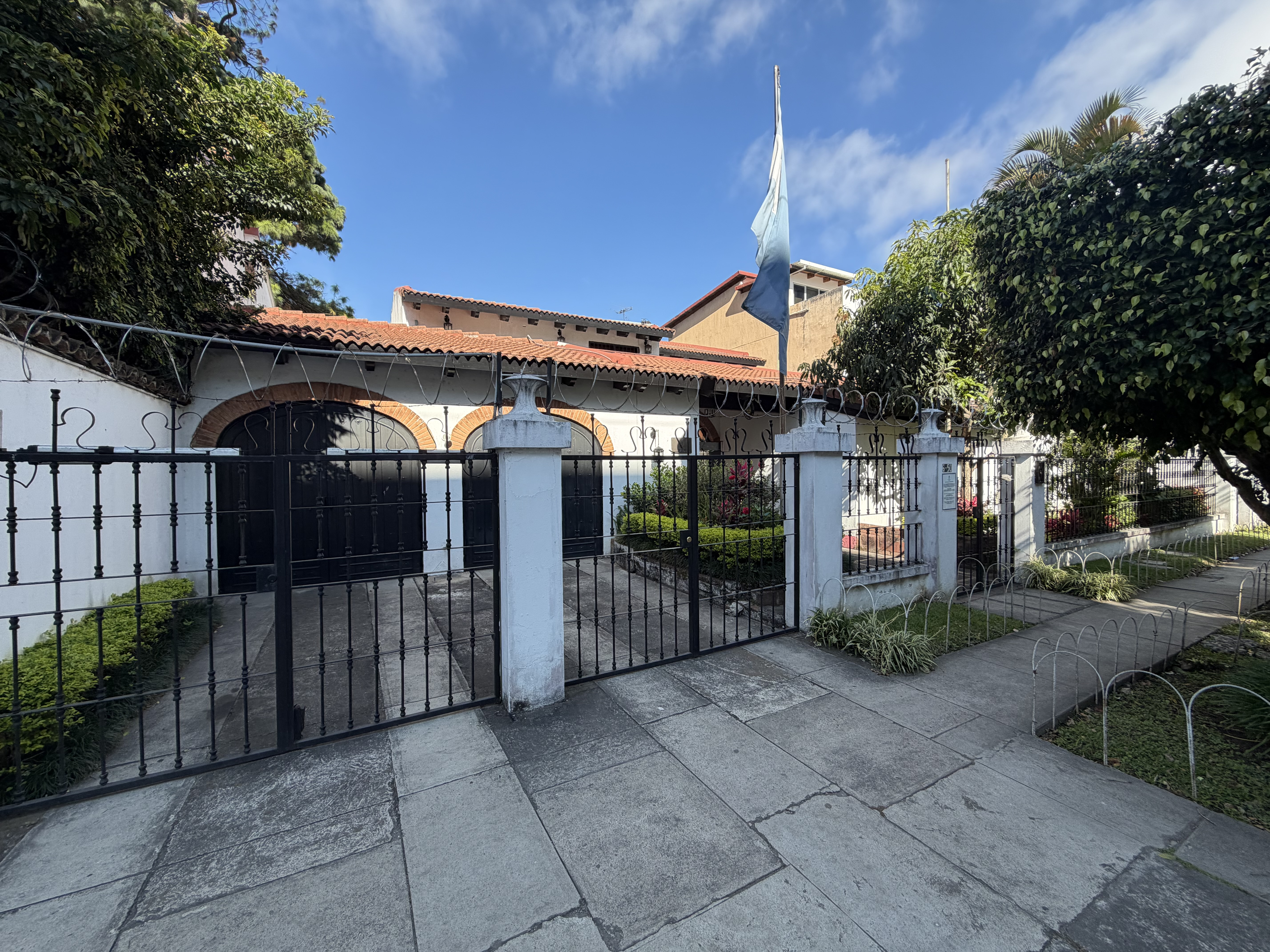
Embassy of Argentina

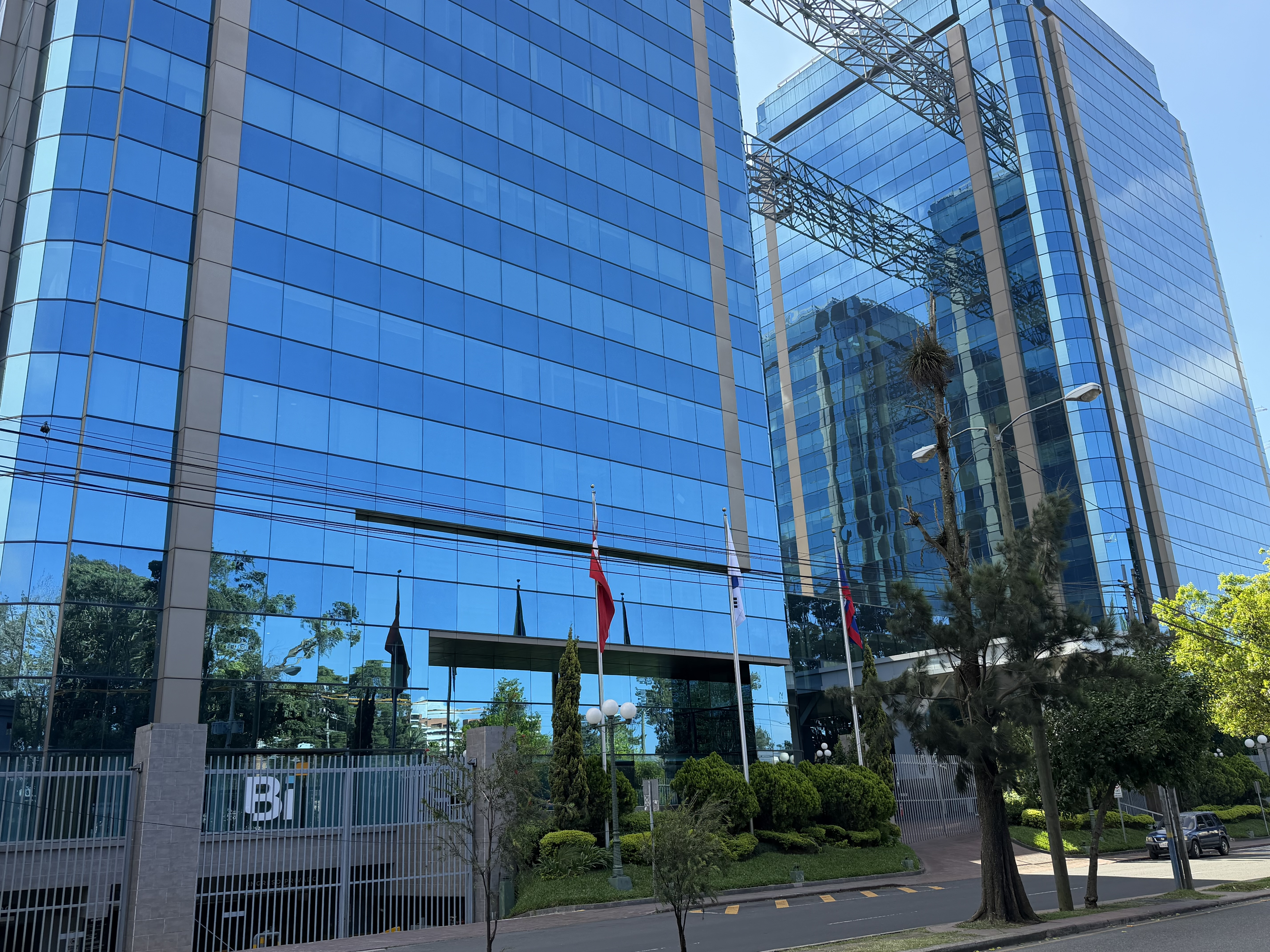
Building hosting the Embassies of Belize, South Korea and Turkey and Delegation of the EU

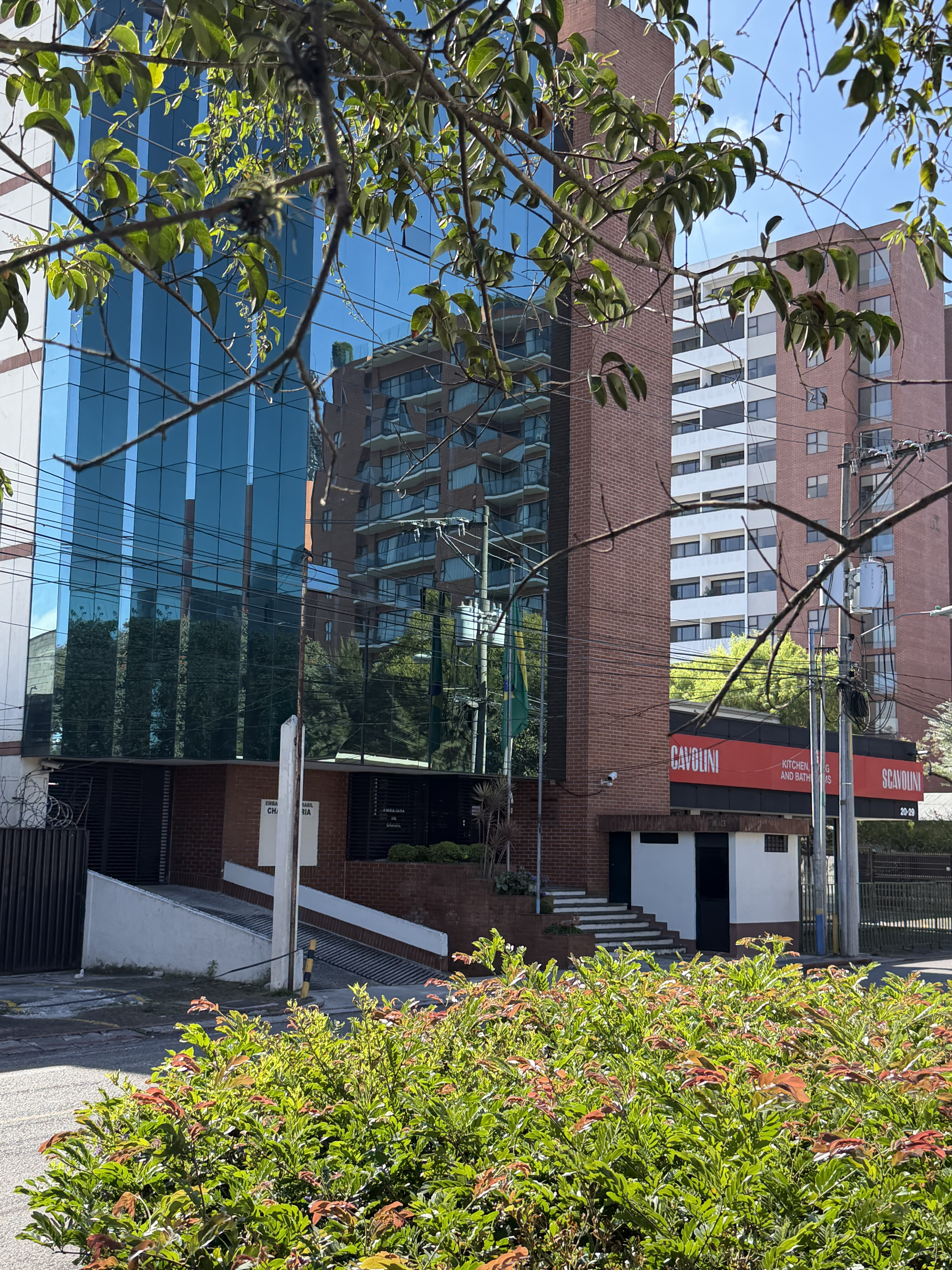
Building hosting the Embassy of Brazil

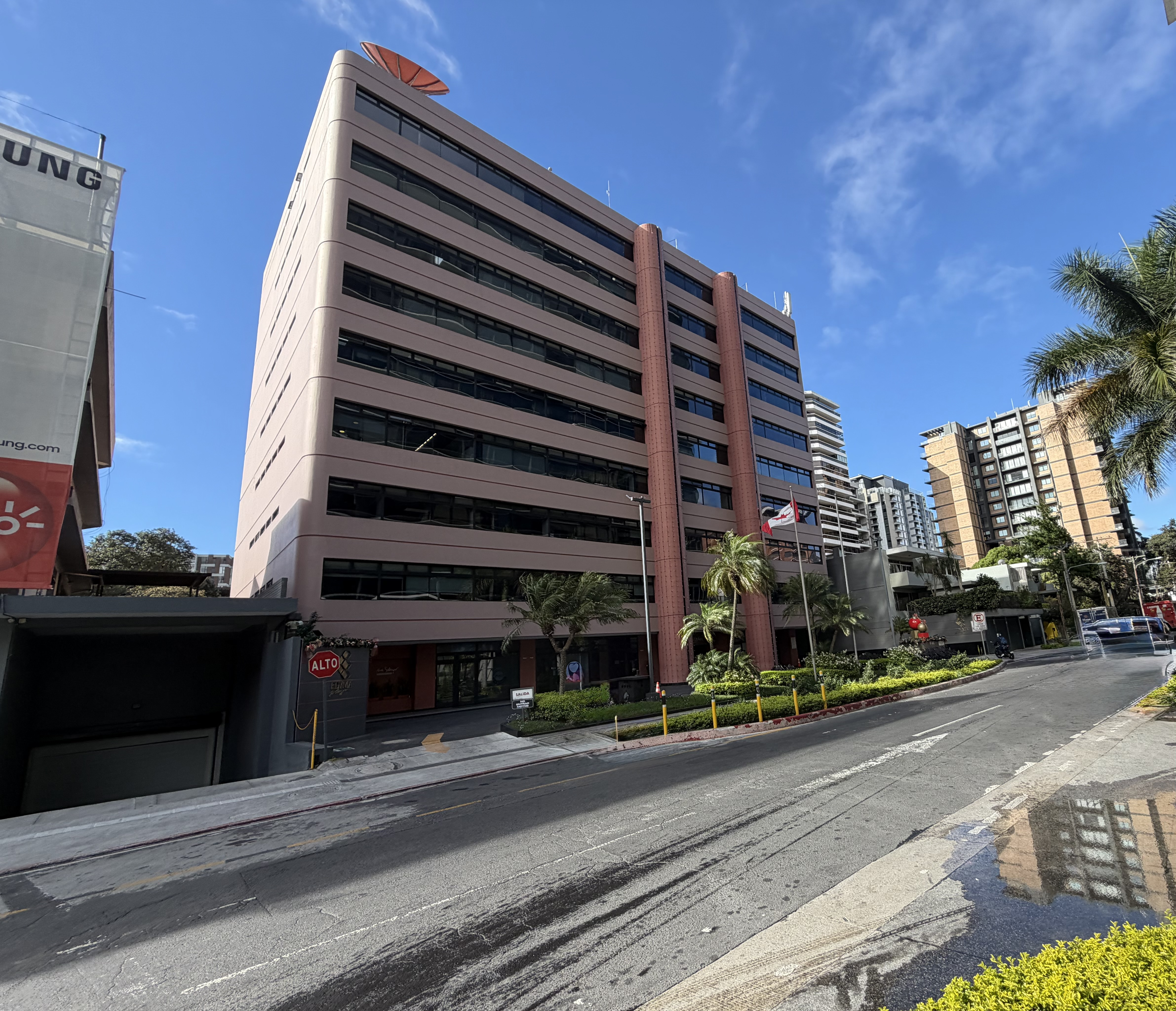
Building hosting the Embassy of Canada

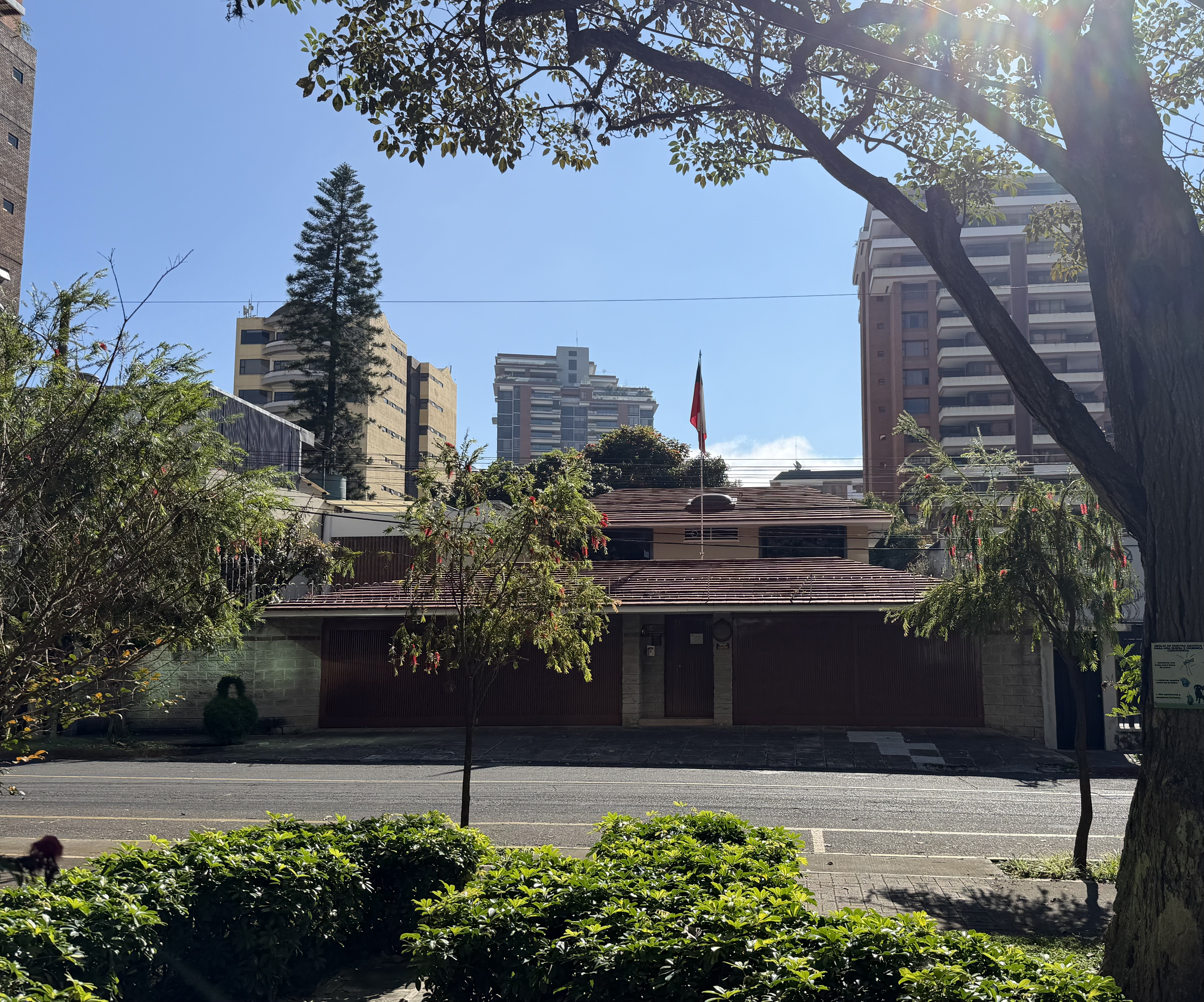
Embassy of Chile

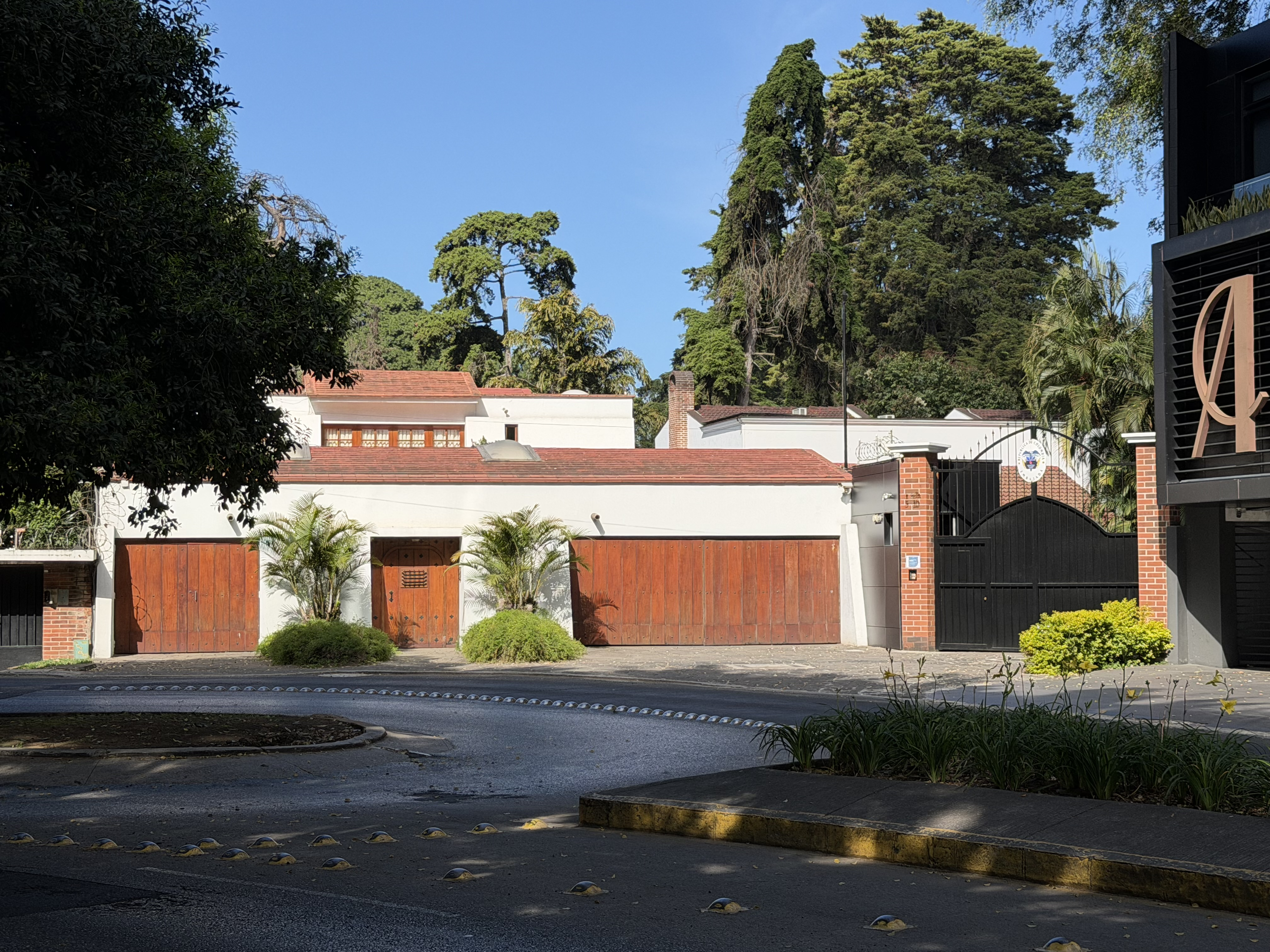
Embassy of Colombia

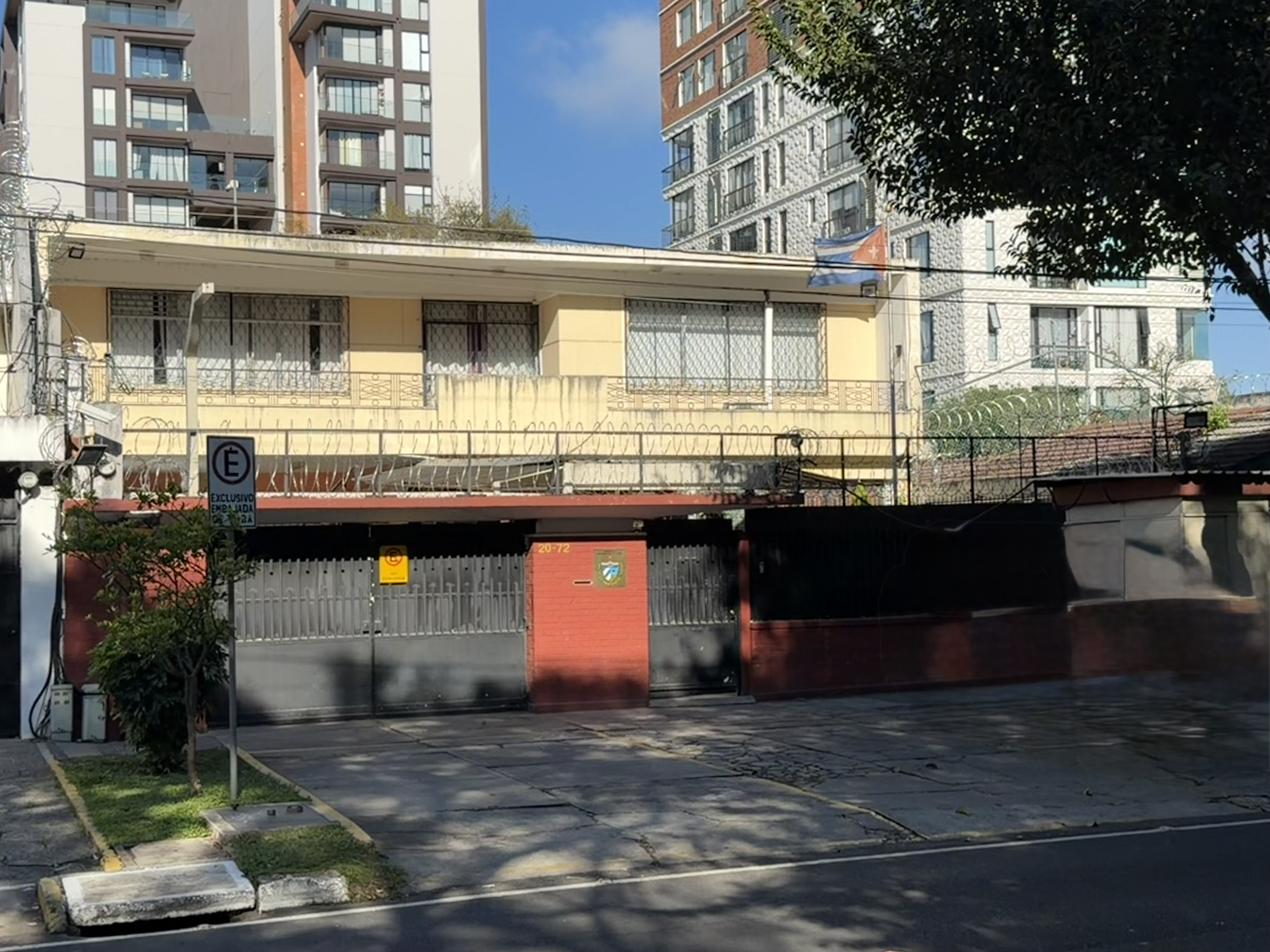
Embassy of Cuba

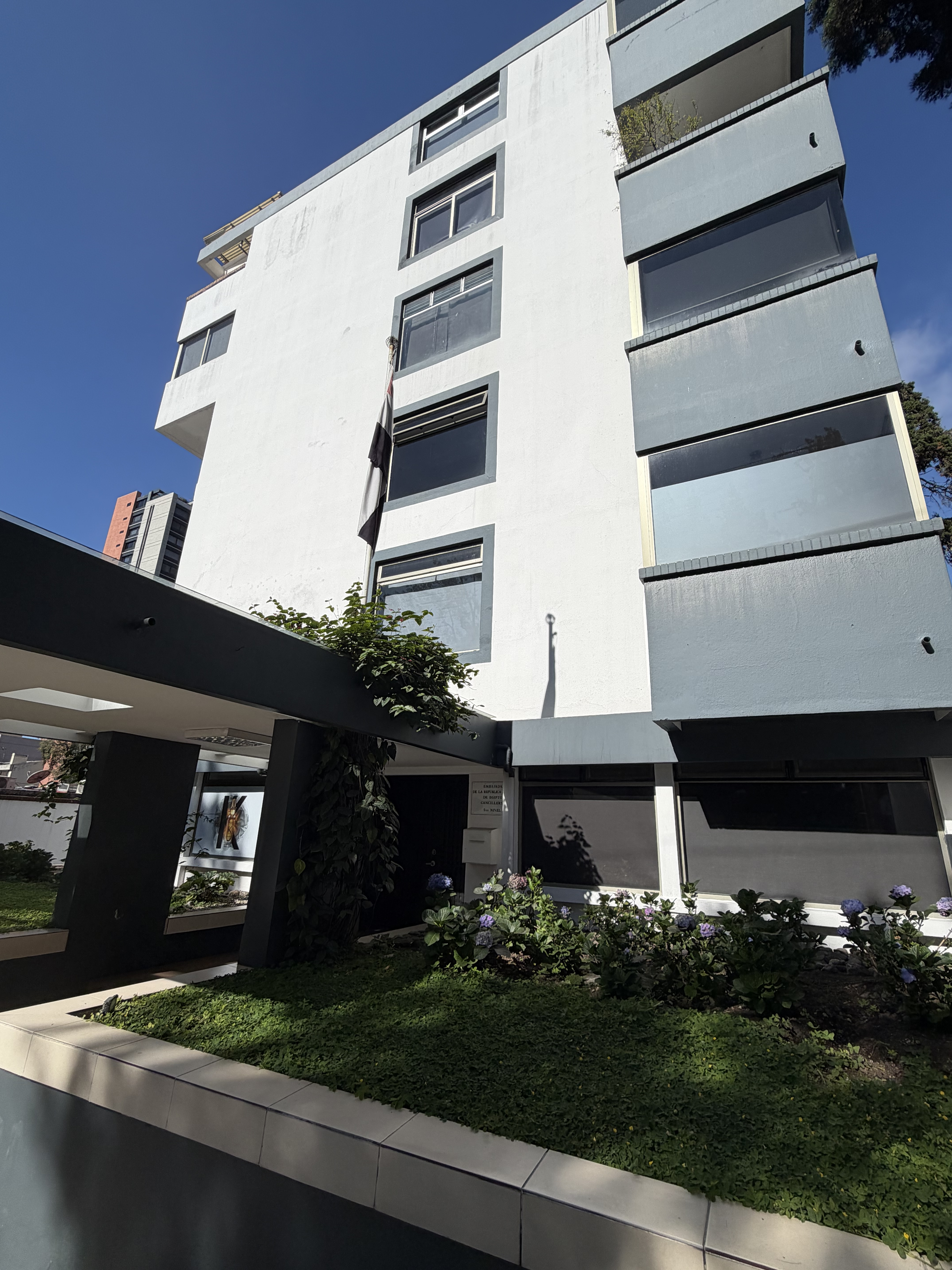
Embassy of Egypt

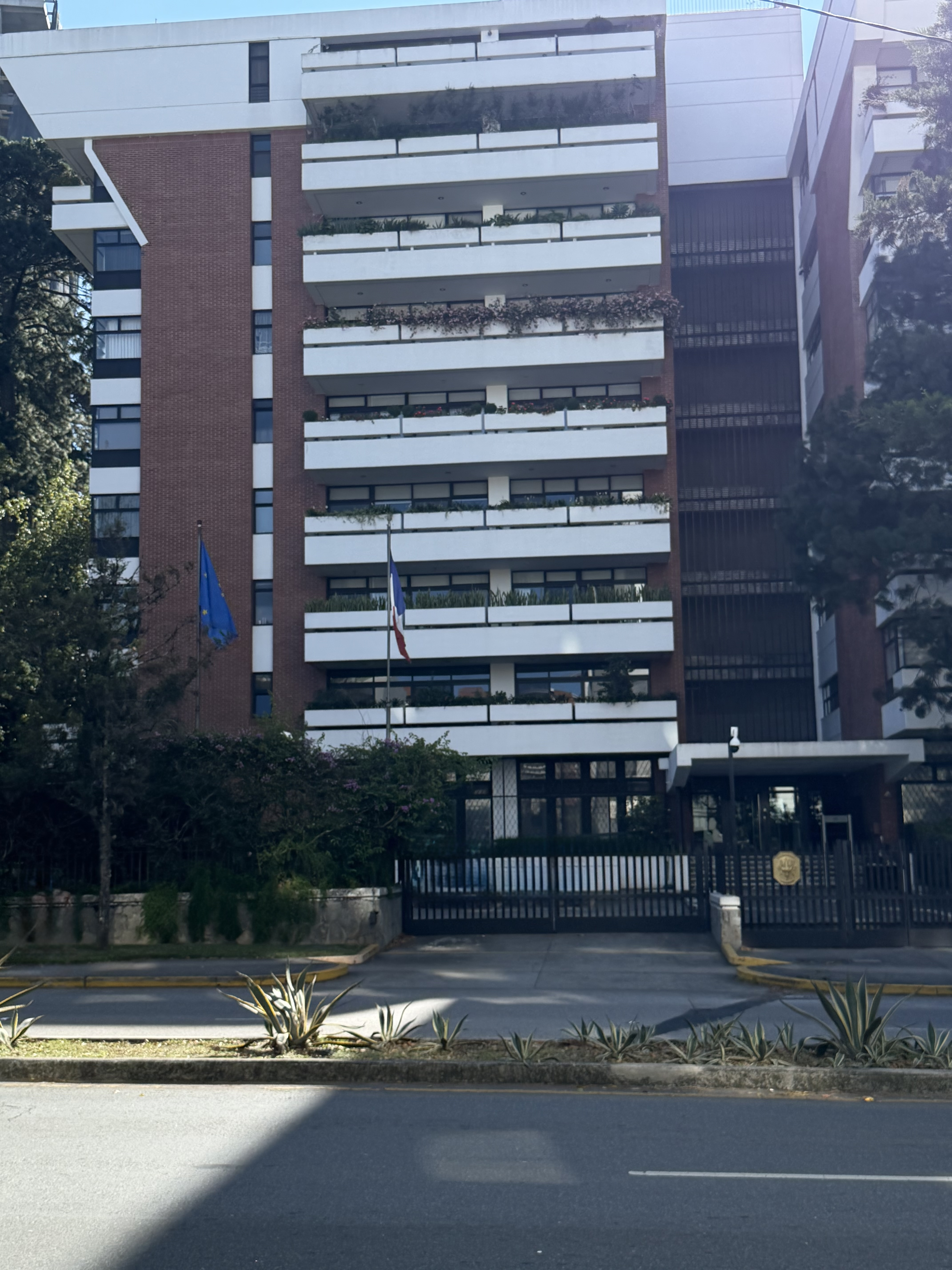
Building hosting the Embassy of France

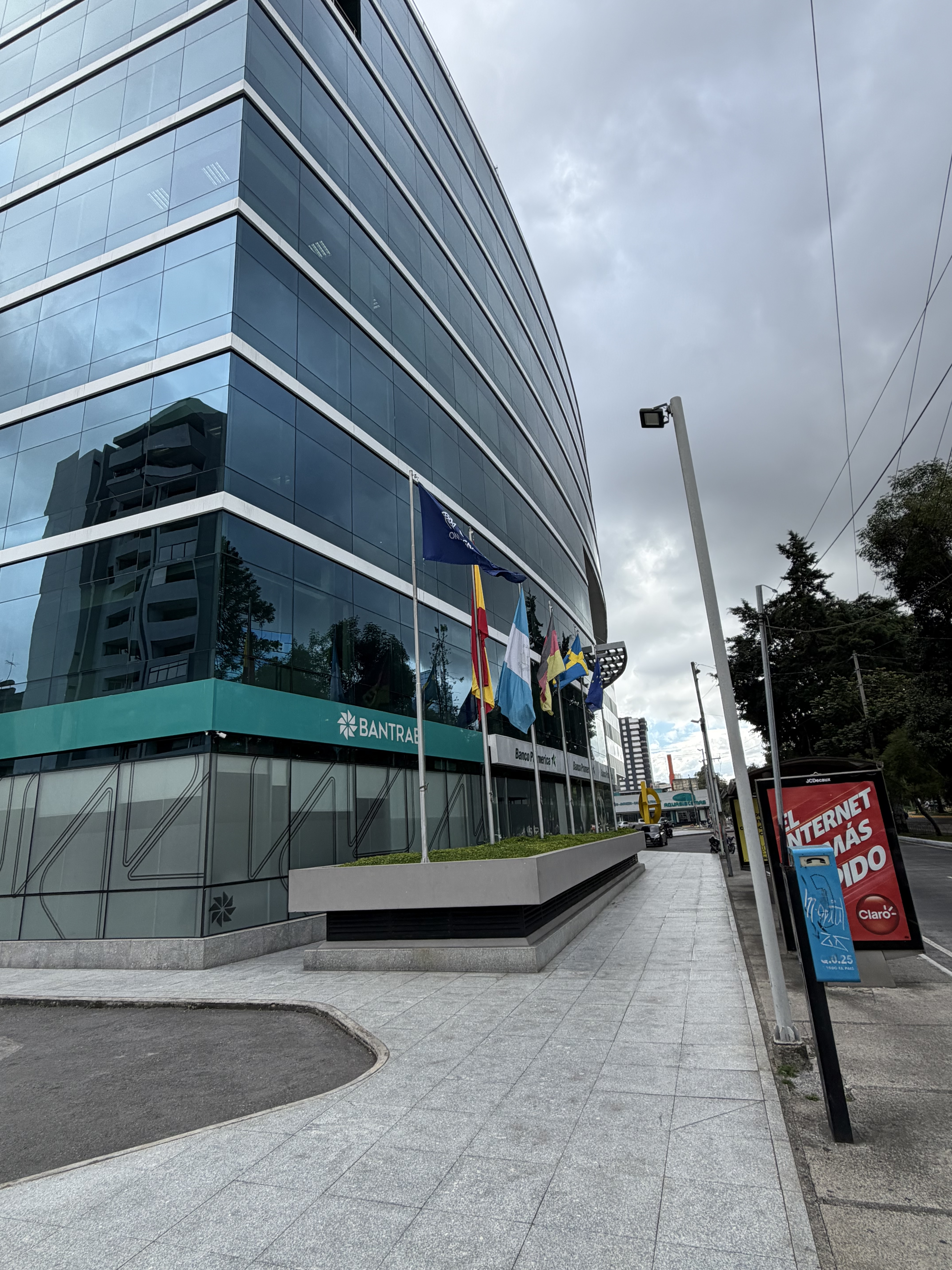
Building hosting the Embassies of Germany and Sweden

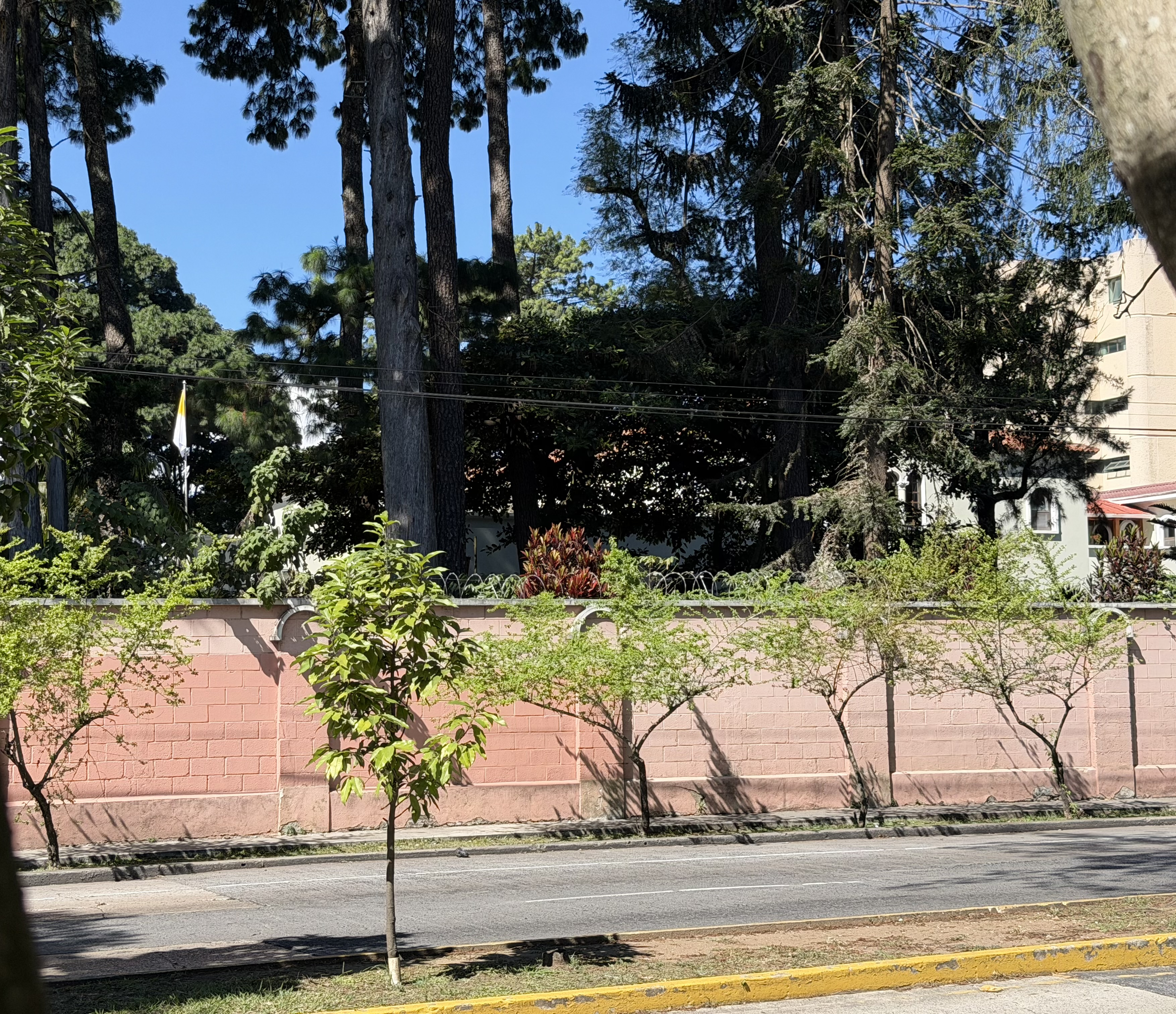
Apostolic Nunciature of the Holy See

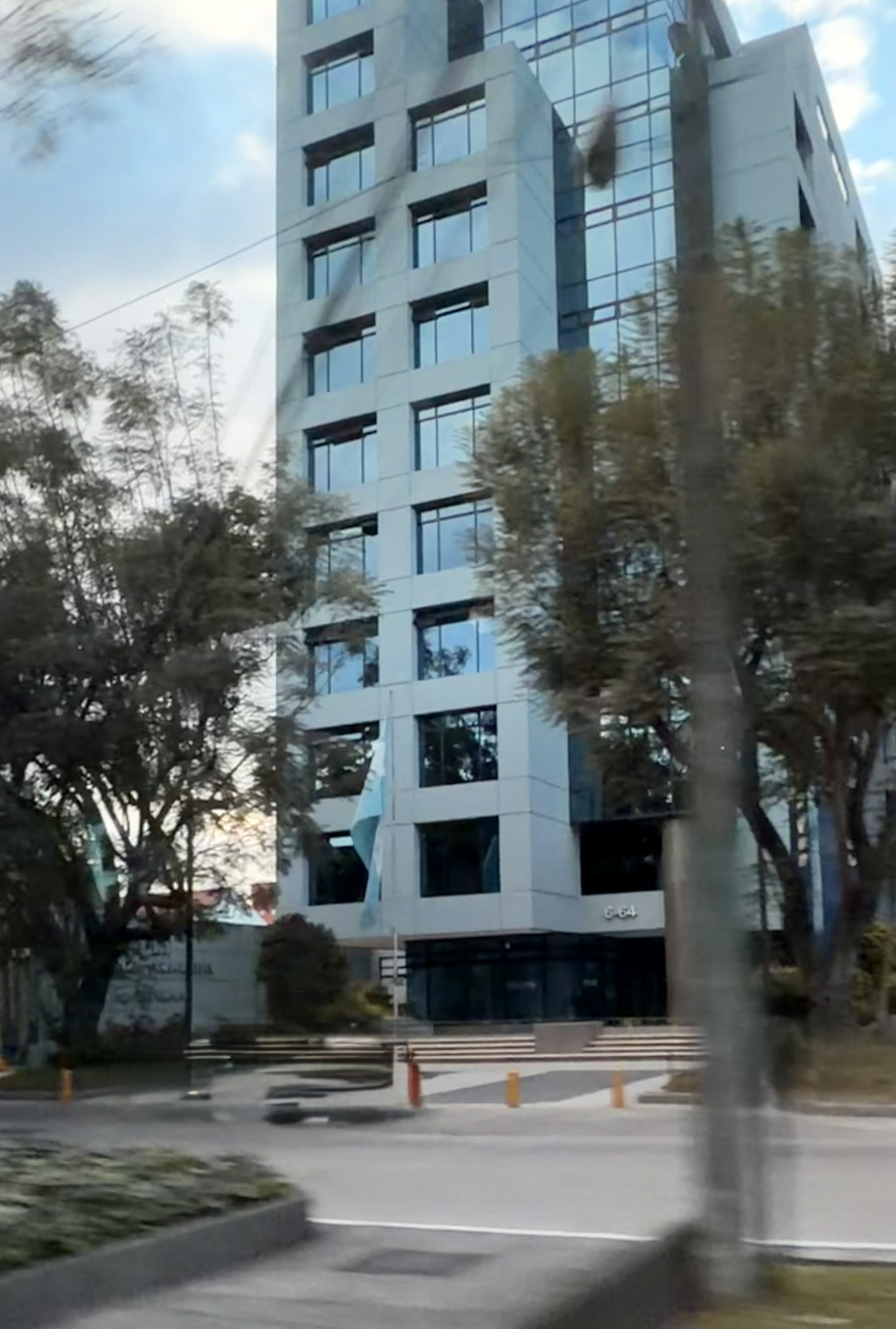
Building hosting the Embassy of Honduras

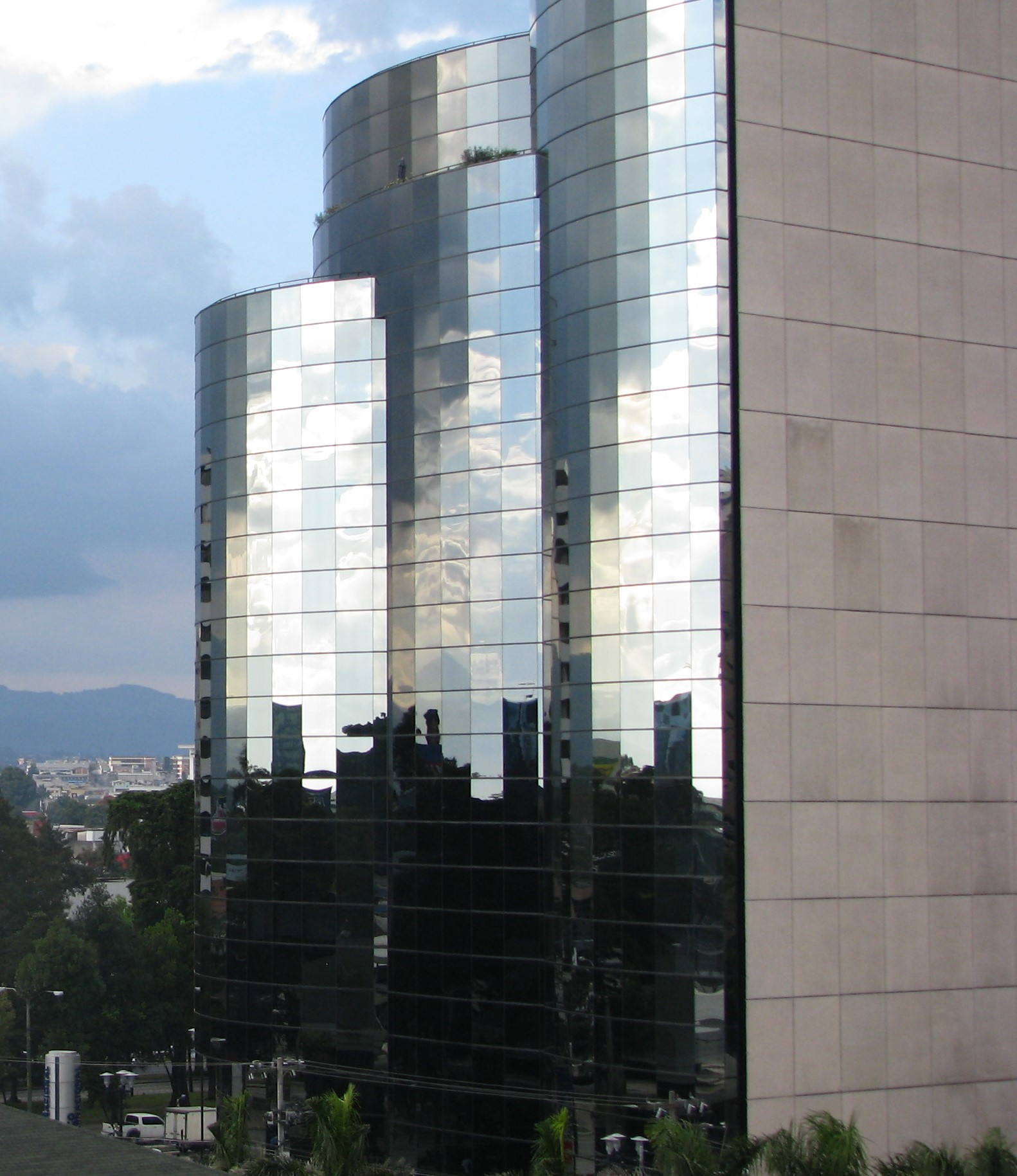
Building hosting the Embassies of Japan, Morocco, Switzerland and the United Kingdom

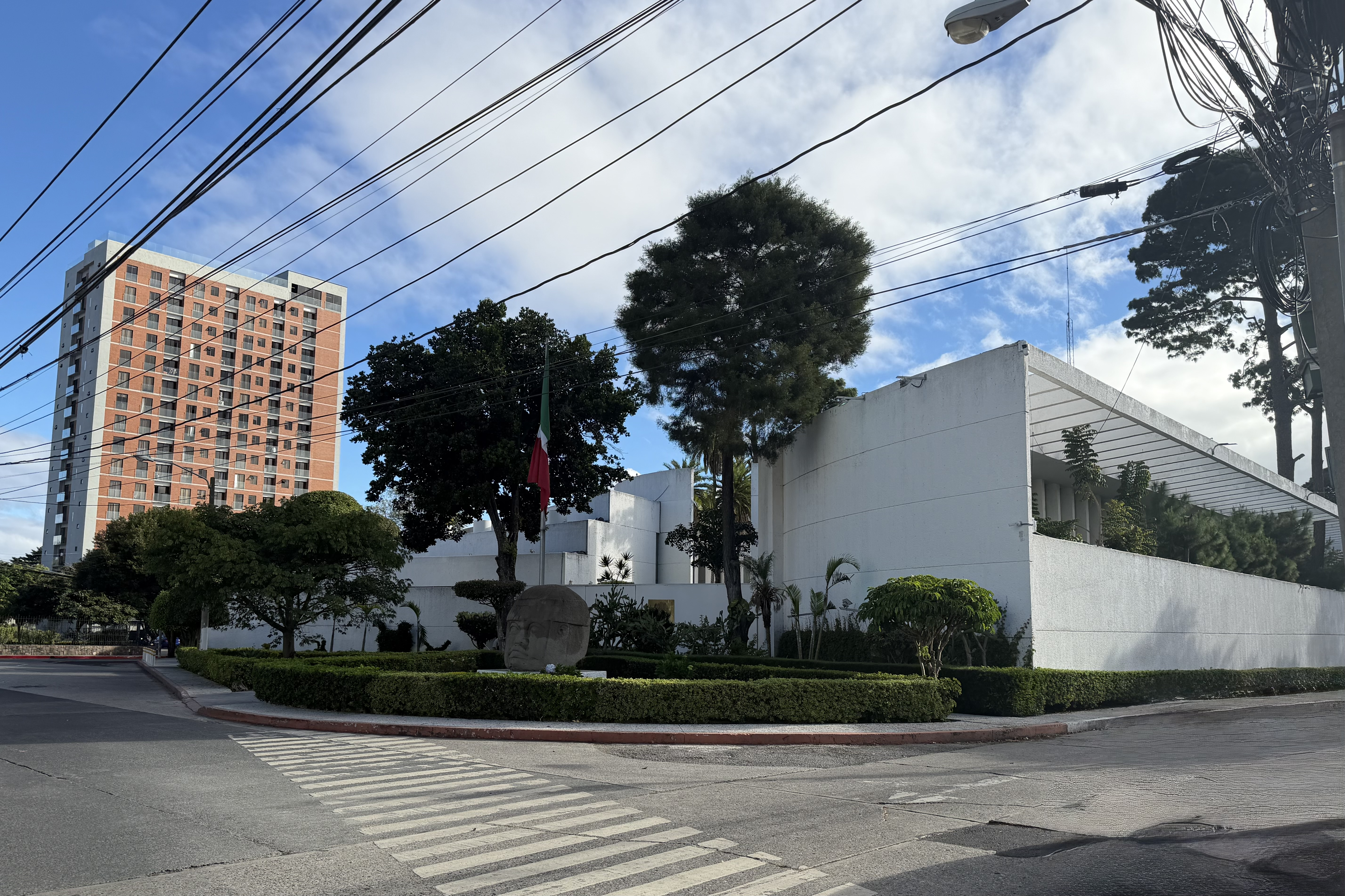
Embassy of Mexico

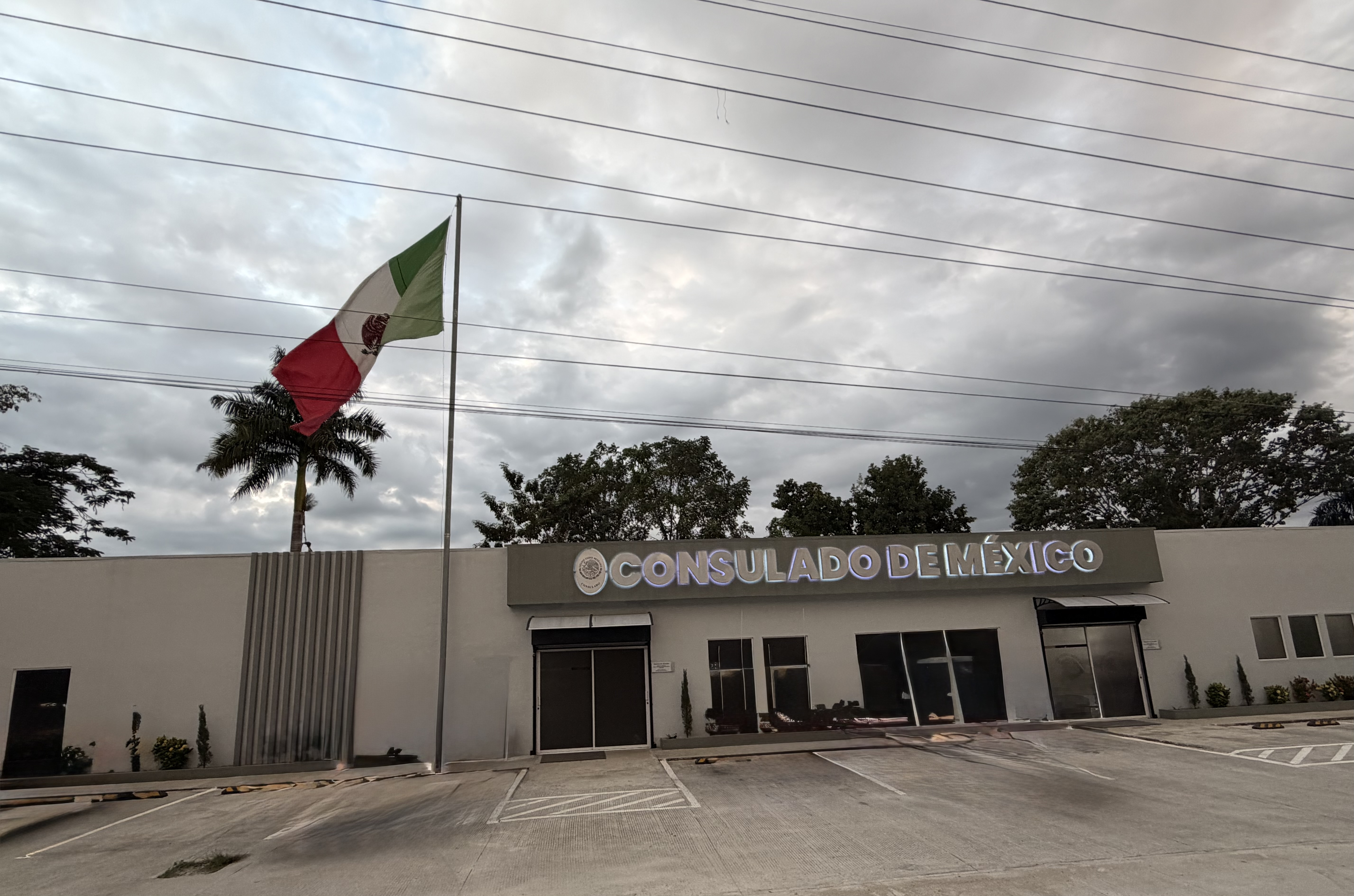
Consulate of Mexico in Flores (Petén)

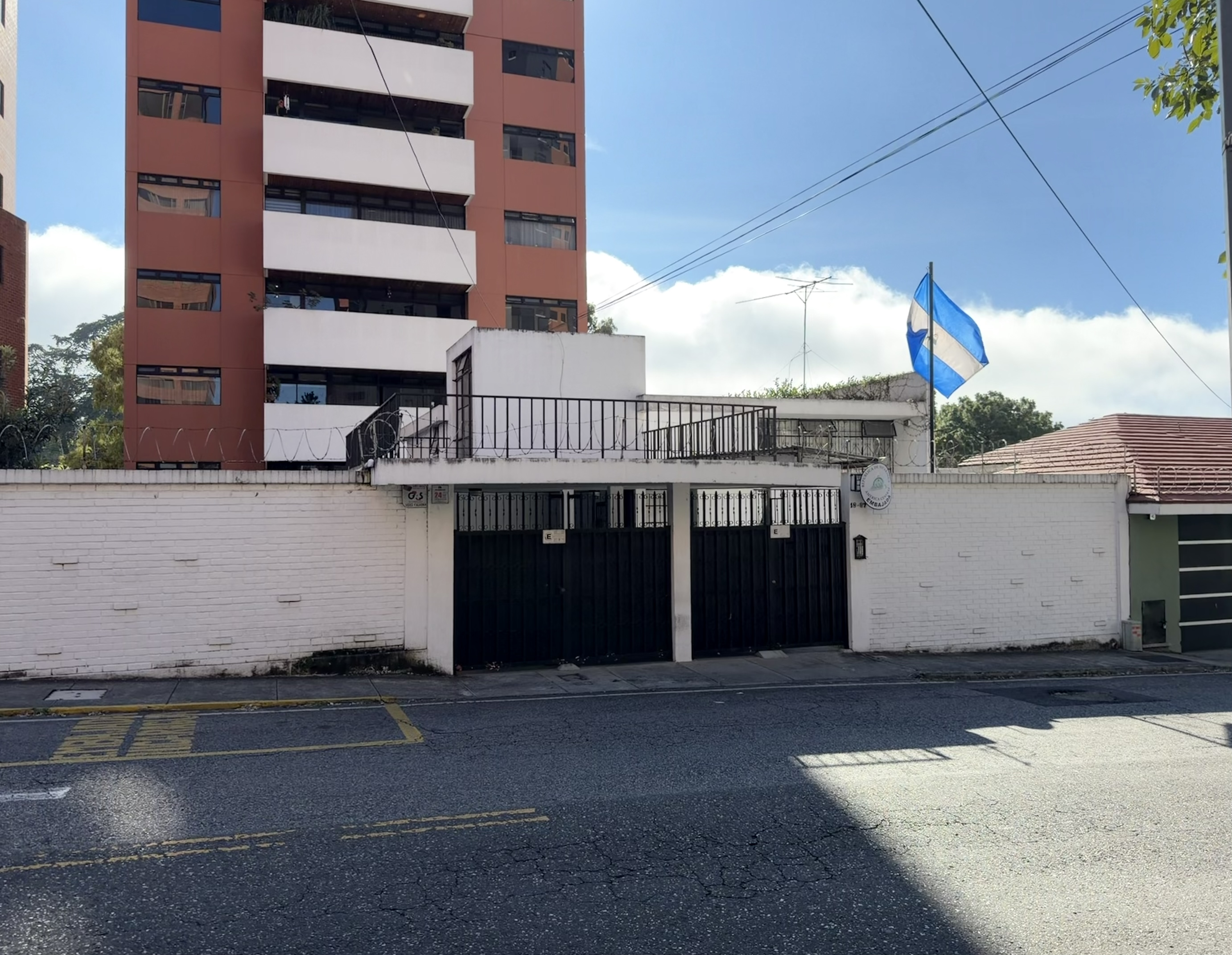
Embassy of Nicaragua

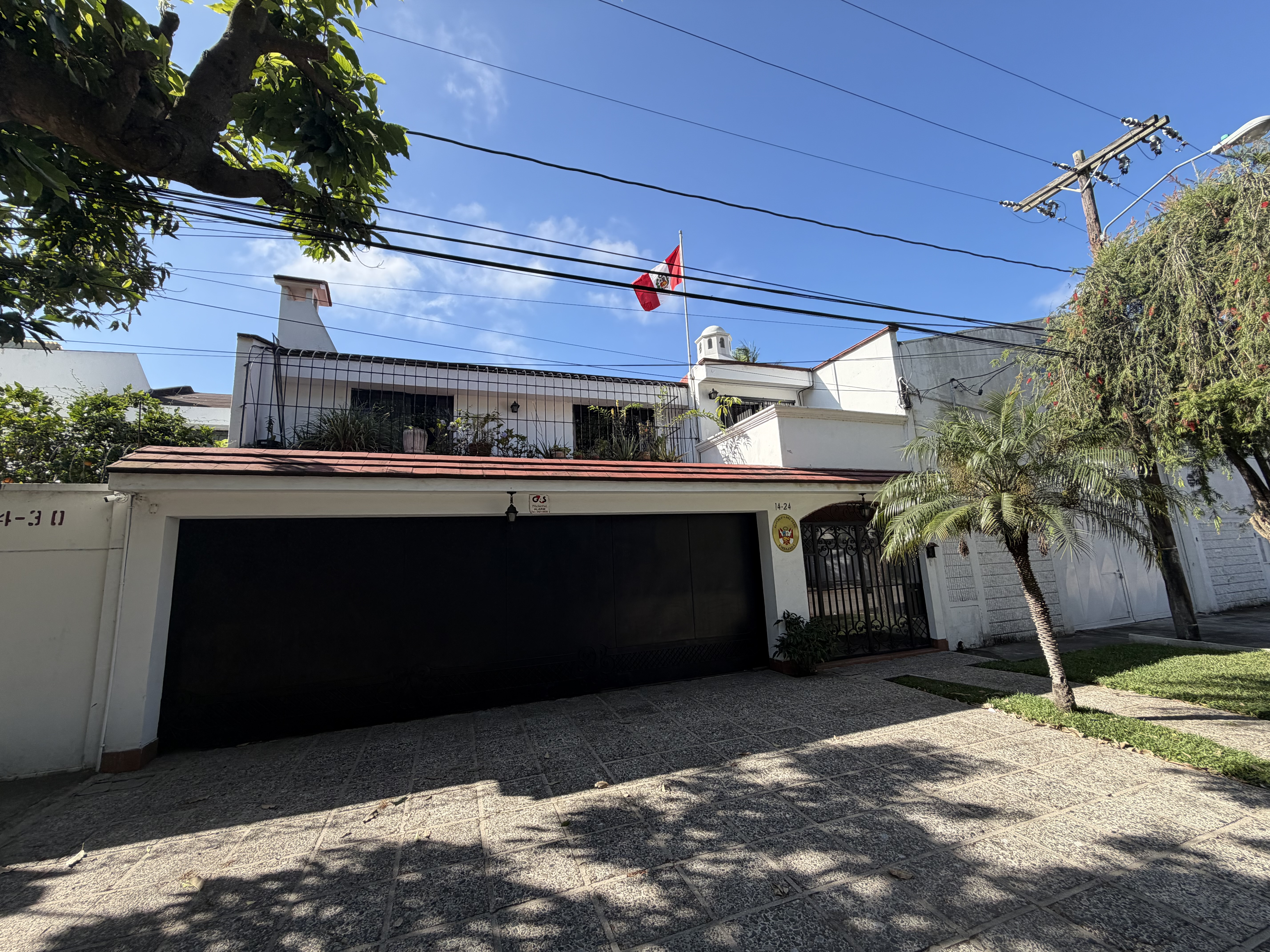
Embassy of Peru

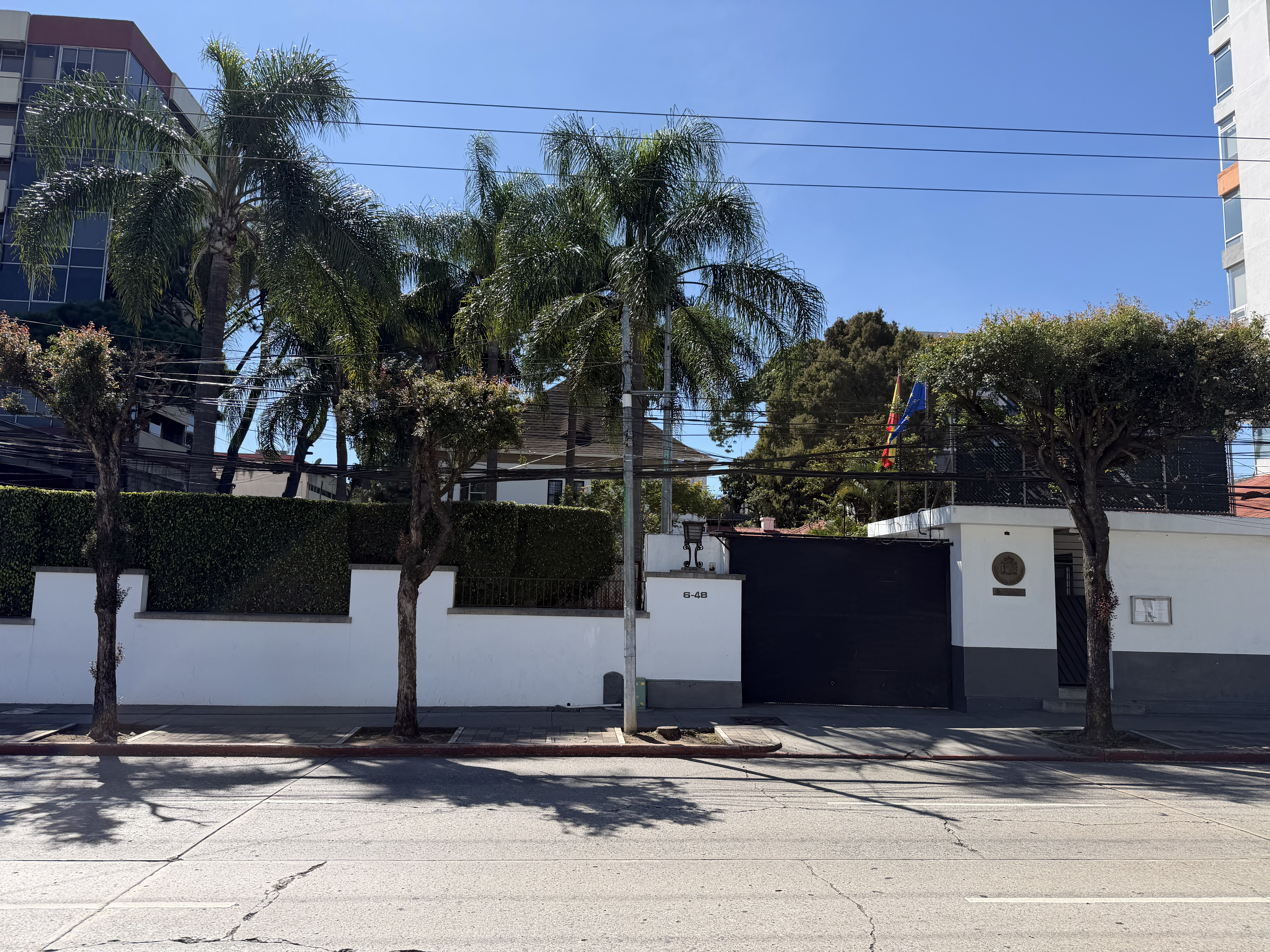
Embassy of Spain

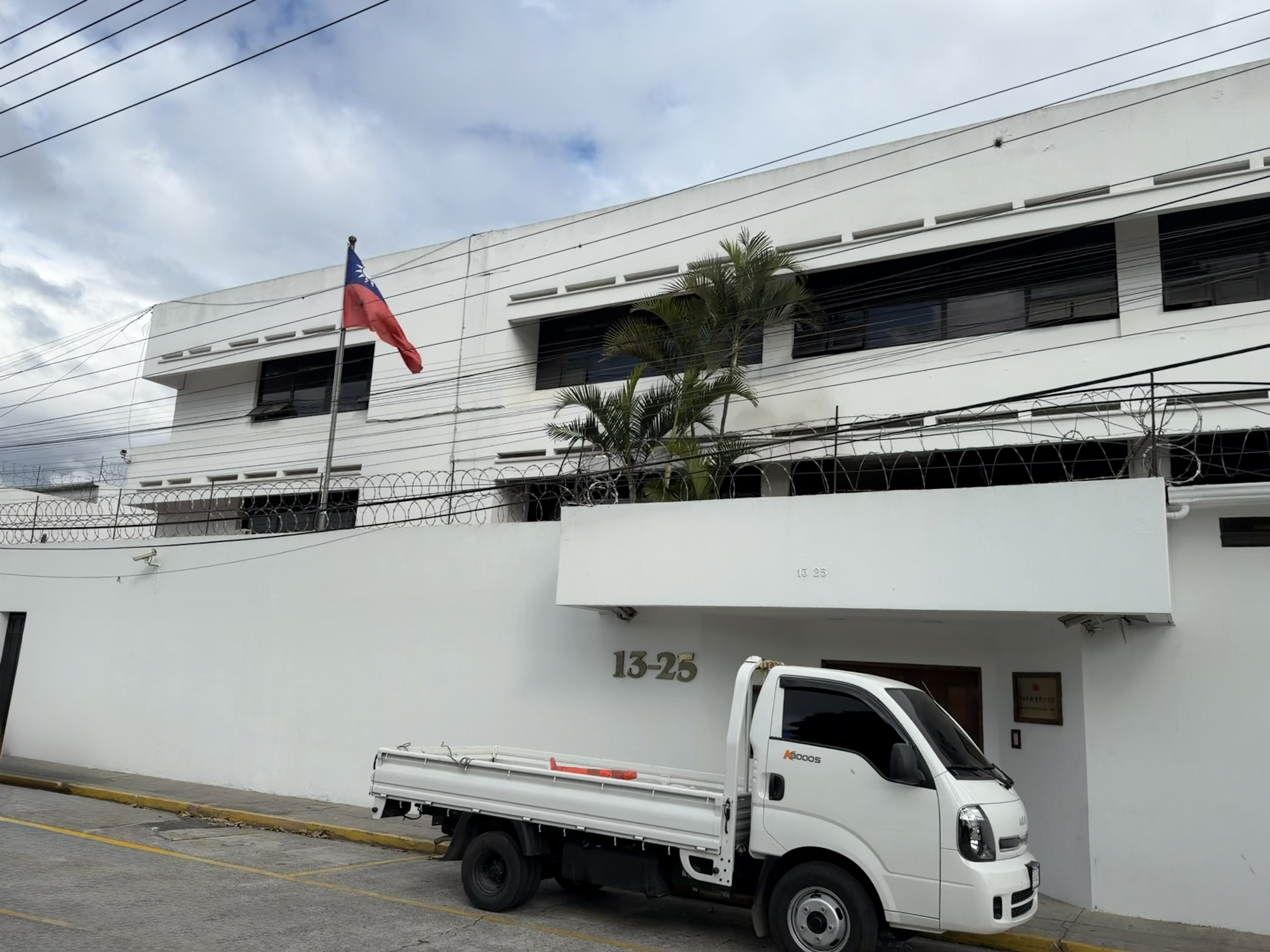
Embassy of Taiwan

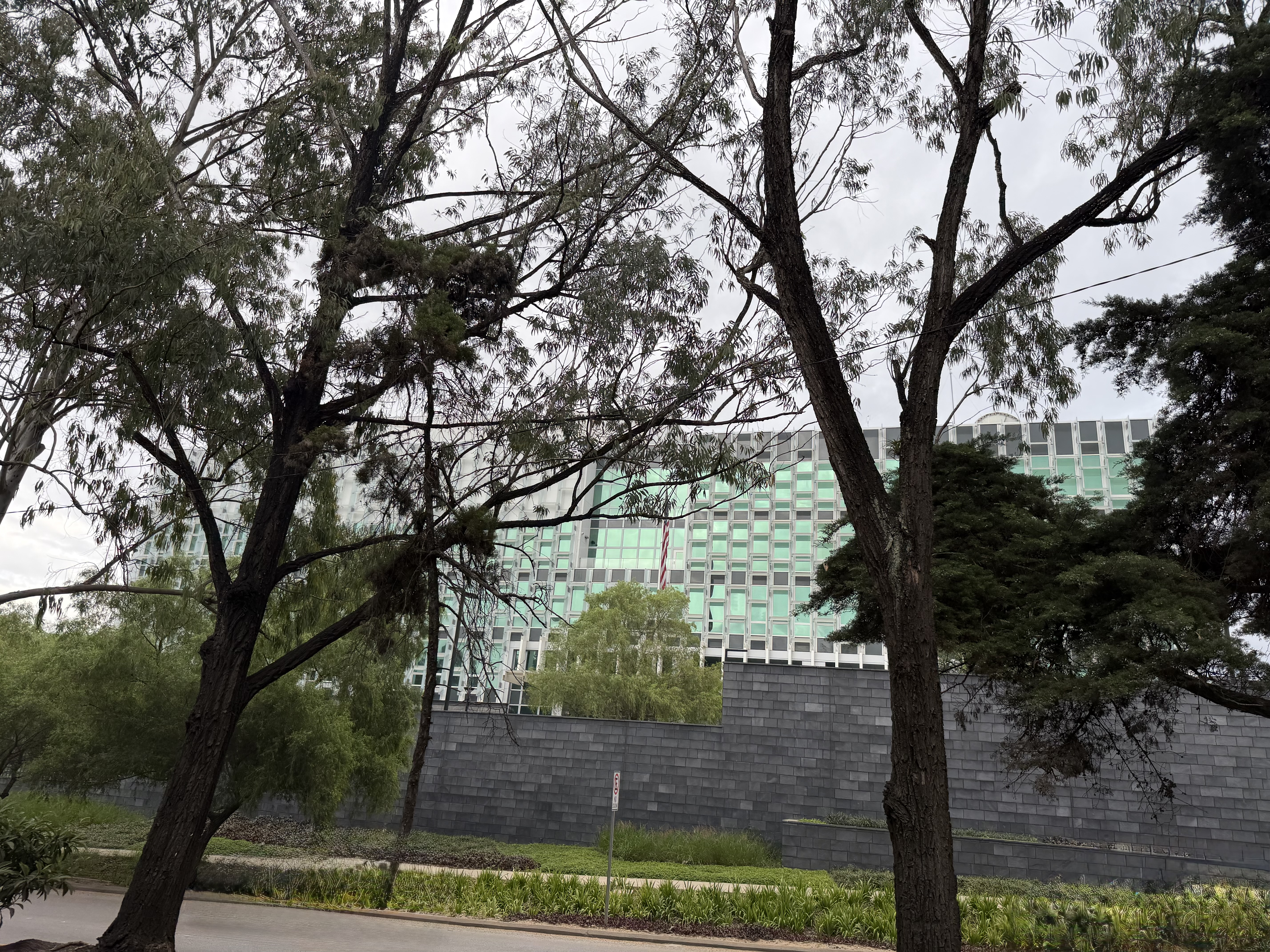
Embassy of the United States

== Non-resident embassies accredited to Guatemala ==
=== Resident in Havana, Cuba ===
1. Angola
2. Benin
3. Burkina Faso
4. Mali
5. Zimbabwe

=== Resident in Mexico City, Mexico ===
1. Algeria
2. Australia
3. Austria
4. Armenia
5. Azerbaijan
6. Bangladesh
7. Bulgaria
8. Czechia
9. Denmark
10. Finland
11. Gambia
12. Georgia
13. Greece
14. Haiti
15. Hungary
16. Indonesia
17. Iran
18. Iraq
19. Ireland
20. Ivory Coast
21. Jamaica
22. Jordan
23. Kazakhstan
24. Kuwait
25. Lebanon
26. Malaysia
27. New Zealand
28. Nigeria
29. North Korea
30. Norway
31. Pakistan
32. Paraguay
33. Philippines
34. Portugal
35. Romania
36. Saudi Arabia
37. South Africa
38. Serbia
39. Slovakia
40. Thailand
41. Ukraine
42. United Arab Emirates
43. Vietnam

=== Resident in Washington, D.C., United States ===
1. Albania
2. Equatorial Guinea
3. Ghana
4. Guyana
5. Lesotho
6. Namibia
7. Nepal
8. Palau
9. Senegal
10. Slovenia
11. Togo
12. Zambia

=== Resident in New York City, United States ===
The following accredited missions are the sending countries' permanent missions to the United Nations.

1. Andorra
2. Antigua and Barbuda
3. Bahamas
4. Belarus
5. Bosnia and Herzegovina
6. Botswana
7. Brunei
8. Cambodia
9. Cameroon
10. Cape Verde
11. Croatia
12. Cyprus
13. Djibouti
14. Dominica
15. Estonia
16. Ethiopia
17. Fiji
18. Gabon
19. Grenada
20. Guinea
21. Kenya
22. Kyrgyzstan
23. Laos
24. Latvia
25. Libya
26. Liechtenstein
27. Lithuania
28. Luxembourg
29. Marshall Islands
30. Maldives
31. Malta
32. Mauritius
33. Micronesia
34. Moldova
35. Monaco
36. Mongolia
37. Mozambique
38. Nauru
39. Niger
40. North Macedonia
41. Rwanda
42. Saint Kitts and Nevis
43. Saint Vincent and the Grenadines
44. Saint Lucia
45. Samoa
46. San Marino
47. Seychelles
48. Sri Lanka
49. Singapore
50. Solomon Islands
51. Suriname
52. Tajikistan
53. Timor-Leste
54. Tunisia
55. Turkmenistan
56. Tuvalu
57. Uzbekistan
58. Yemen

=== Resident in Panama City, Panama ===
1. Barbados
2. Belgium
3. Poland

=== Resident in San José, Costa Rica ===
1. Bolivia
2. Netherlands
3. Trinidad and Tobago

=== Resident in other cities ===
1. Iceland (Reykjavík)
2. Oman (Brasília)
3. Nicaragua (San Salvador)
4. Qatar (San Salvador)\
5. Vanuatu (Canberra)

=== Unverified ===
- Afghanistan (Washington, D.C.)
- Central African Republic (Washington, D.C.)
- Chad (Washington, D.C.)
- Comoros (New York City)
- Eswatini (New York City)
- Guinea-Bissau (New York City)
- Myanmar (Havana)
- Palestine (Managua)
- Sierra Leone (New York City)
- Somalia (New York City)
- South Sudan (New York City)
- Sudan (Washington, D.C.)
- Uganda (Washington, D.C.)

== Closed missions ==
Host city	Sending country	Mission	Year closed	Ref.
Guatemala City	Netherlands	Embassy	2011	
Guatemala City	Nicaragua	Embassy	2024	
Guatemala City	Norway	Embassy	2016	
Guatemala City	Venezuela	Embassy	2020	
Malacatán	Mexico	Consulate	1982	

== See also ==
- Foreign relations of Guatemala
- List of diplomatic missions of Guatemala
- Visa requirements for Guatemalan citizens
