= Guatemala–Venezuela relations =

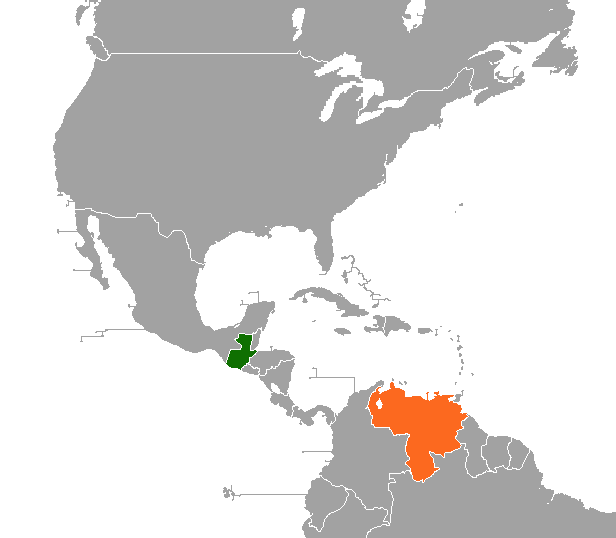
- Guatemala: Venezuela

Guatemala and Venezuela maintain bilateral relations.

== History ==
In 2020, during the Venezuelan presidential crisis, Guatemalan President Alejandro Giammattei announced it would sever ties with Venezuela, prompting to close its embassy both in Caracas and Guatemala City. In January 2019, Guatemala already recognized Juan Guaido as Venezuela’s legit president.

== See also ==
- Foreign relations of Guatemala
- Foreign relations of Venezuela
