= Colombia–Guatemala relations =

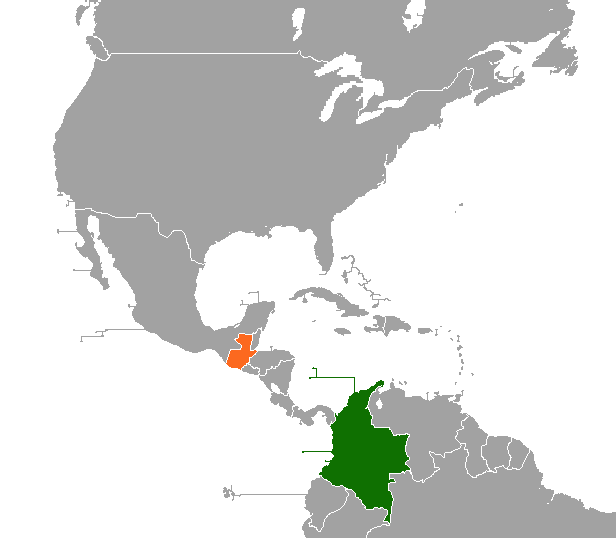
- Colombia: Guatemala

Colombia and Guatemala established bilateral relations in 1825. Both countries are full members of the Rio Group, Latin Union, Association of Spanish Language Academies, Organization of American States, Organization of Ibero-American States, Community of Latin American and Caribbean States, Cairns Group, and the Group of 77.

== History ==
Both countries began bilateral relations on January 1, 1825. Colombia is the fifth country with which Guatemala established diplomatic relations.

On July 25, 1980, the Joint Commission for Economic, Technical, Scientific and Cultural Cooperation was created by an exchange of notes by the Ministers of Foreign Affairs Diego Uribe Vargas and Rafael Castillo Valdez. It aims to promote cooperation between Colombia and Guatemala.

On January 17, 2023, the government of Guatemala accused Colombia's defense minister Iván Velásquez Gómez of corruption, which sparked tensions between the two nations.

== Bilateral agreements ==
The two nations have signed several bilateral agreements such as an Exchange of notes constituting an agreement on "elimination of the visa requirement on ordinary passports in force" between the government of the Republic of Colombia and the government of Guatemala (1993); Exchange of notes constituting an agreement to restructure the binational commission between the Republic of Colombia and the Republic of Guatemala (1998); Exchange of notes constituting an agreement for the establishment of a mechanism chaired by the Vice Ministers of Foreign Affairs to facilitate the review and monitoring of the different aspects of the bilateral relationship as well as the execution of the decisions adopted by both governments between the Republic of Colombia and the Republic of Guatemala (1998); Agreement between the Government of the Republic of Colombia and the Government of the Republic of Guatemala on reciprocity in the free exercise of remunerated activities for dependent family members of diplomatic, consular, administrative and technical personnel of diplomatic and consular missions and permanent representations to international organizations (2005); Technical cooperation agreement in the educational field between the Government of the Republic of Colombia and the Government of the Republic of Guatemala (2006) and a Free Trade Agreement between the Republic of Colombia and the Republics of El Salvador, Guatemala and Honduras.

== Trade ==
In 2017, Colombia had a significant net trade with Guatemala in exporting Mineral Products ($176M), Chemical Products ($81.1M), and Machines ($56.5M). Five years later in 2022, Guatemala exported $112M to Colombia. The products exported from Guatemala to Colombia included Industrial Fatty Acids, Oils and Alcohols ($28.4M), Raw Sugar ($27.5M), and Pesticides ($13.3M). Colombia exported $480M to Guatemala. The products exported from Colombia to Guatemala were Coal Briquettes ($173M), Refrigerators ($26.5M), and Raw Plastic Sheeting ($18.5M).

== Resident diplomatic missions ==
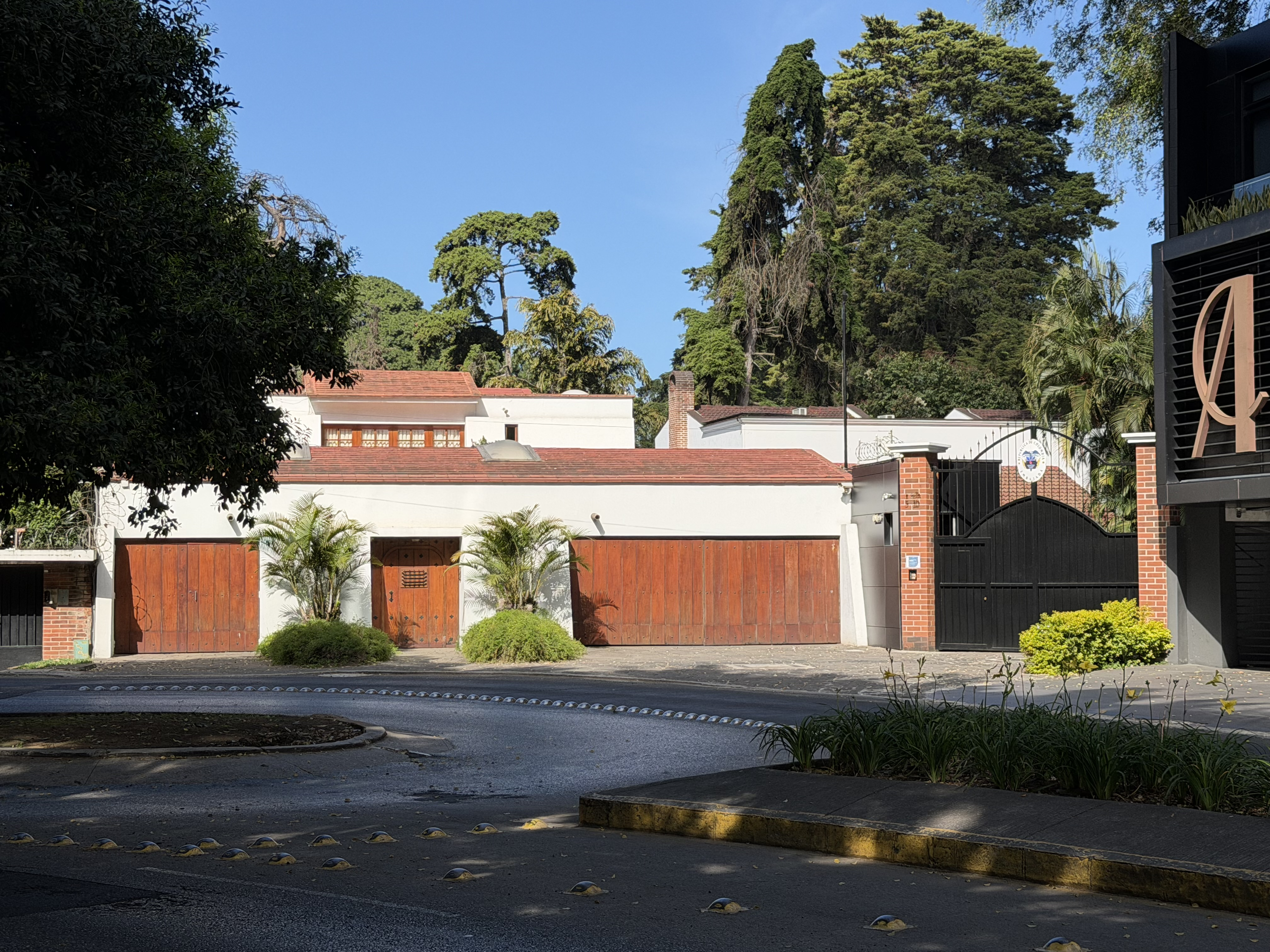
Embassy of Colombia in Guatemala City

- Guatemala has an embassy in Bogotá.
- Colombia has an embassy in Guatemala City.

== See also ==
- Foreign relations of Colombia
- Foreign relations of Guatemala
