= Guatemala–Uruguay relations =

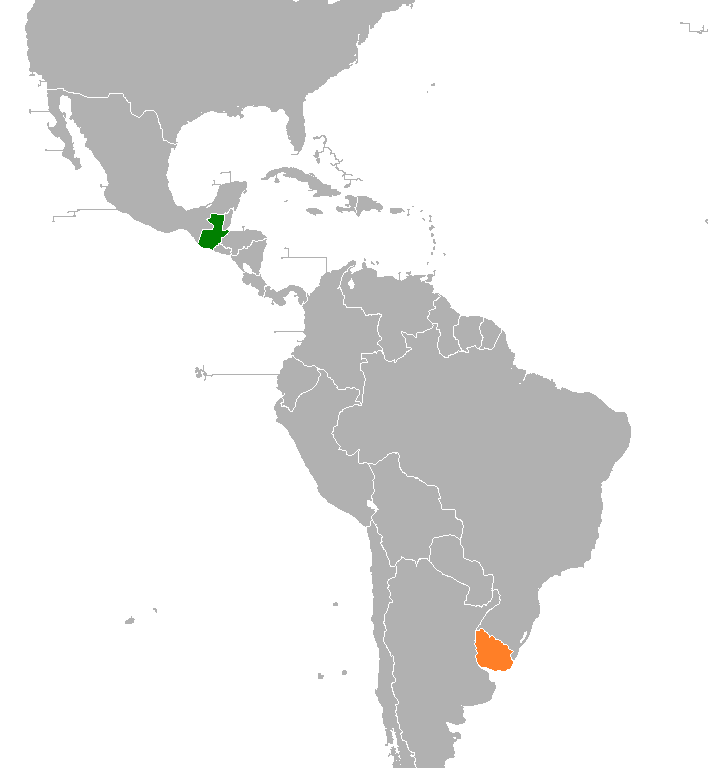
- Guatemala: Uruguay

Guatemala and Uruguay have long-standing diplomatic relations . Both nations are members of the Community of Latin American and Caribbean States, Group of 77, Organization of American States, Organization of Ibero-American States and the United Nations.

== History ==
Both Guatemala and Uruguay share a common history in the fact that both nations were once part of the Spanish Empire. During the Spanish colonial period, Guatemala was governed from the Viceroyalty of New Spain in Mexico City while Uruguay was then part of the Viceroyalty of the Río de la Plata and administered from Buenos Aires. In 1828, Uruguay obtained its independence after the Cisplatine War. In 1841, Guatemala obtained its independence after the dissolution of the Federal Republic of Central America. In March 1907, both nations established diplomatic relations.

Bilateral relations between both nations have taken place primarily in multilateral forums. In November 2006 Guatemalan Vice-President Eduardo Stein attended the 16th Ibero-American Summit in Montevideo. In November 2018 Uruguayan Vice-President Lucía Topolansky paid a visit to Antigua, Guatemala to attend the 26th Ibero-American Summit.

President-elect of Guatemala Bernardo Arévalo was born on 7 October 1958 in Montevideo, Uruguay, the son of Juan José Arévalo, the former President of Guatemala between 1945 and 1951, and his second wife, Margarita de León. At the time of Arévalo's birth, his father was living in political exile in South America following the 1954 Guatemalan coup d'état.

== Bilateral agreements ==
Both nations have signed several agreements such as an Agreement on Scientific and Technical Cooperation (1987); Cultural Agreement (1987); Agreement on Economic and Commercial Cooperation (1987); Memorandum of Understanding on Political Consultations (2007); Agreement for the Exchange of Information Regarding the Design and Implementation of Drug Policies (2013); Agreement in Academic Cooperation (2013); and an Agreement on Trade and Investment (2019).

== Resident diplomatic missions ==
- Guatemala has an embassy in Montevideo.
- Uruguay has an embassy in Guatemala City.

== See also ==
- Foreign relations of Guatemala
- Foreign relations of Uruguay
