= Guatemala–Israel relations =

- Guatemala: Israel

Guatemala–Israel relations are the bilateral relations between Guatemala and Israel.

Guatemala is one of the first countries to vote in favor Israel's creation as a Jewish state in the United Nations Resolution 181.

The embassy of Guatemala to Israel is in Jerusalem and the embassy of Israel to Guatemala is in Guatemala City.

== History ==
=== UNSCOP and UN Resolution 181 ===
One of the 11 UNSCOP members is the Guatemalan ambassador's to the United Nations, Jorge García Granados who also supported the UN Partition Plan and the establishment of a Jewish state. On 29 November 1947 Guatemala is one of the first countries and the first in Latin America to vote in favor Israel's creation as a Jewish state in the United Nations Resolution 181.

=== From 1948 to 2000 ===
In 1955, Guatemala was the first country to open embassy in Jerusalem, and in 1956 Israel opened its embassy in Guatemala City. Jorge García Granados was appointed as the first Guatemalan ambassador to Israel.

As the Israeli Agency for International Development Cooperation MASHAV was established in 1958, the founder and foreign minister Golda Meir, made her visit to Guatemala in 1959, and in 1962 the first Guatemalan scholarship recipient in agriculture is sent to Israel, making Guatemala one of the first countries to receive support from MASHAV. On 27 November 1961 Guatemala and Israel have signed a Cultural exchange treaty on the exchange of culture, education, and science between the countries. The Cultural exchange treaty was entered into force on 28 May 1962.

In 1972, Guatemala and Israel have abolished the visa requirement on all types of visas. In the late 1970s Granados's grandson was kidnapped by guerrillas, the family asked Israel for help. Granados's grandson was successfully released. In 1980 Guatemala moved its embassy to Tel Aviv due to international pressure of the United Nations Security Council Resolution 478. In 1982 Guatemala and Israel have signed a Trade Agreement and Economic Cooperation treaty.

=== From 2000 ===
On 6 November 2006, Guatemala and Israel have signed an agreement of the Promotion and Protection of Investments which entered into force on 14 January 2009. In 2017 the Guatemala-Israel Parliamentary Friendship League was established including the parties from different ideologies. In May 2018, Guatemala decided to relocate the embassy from Tel Aviv back to Jerusalem. On 8 September 2022, Guatemala and Israel signed a Free Trade Agreement (FTA) which entered into force on first of March 2024.

Bernardo Arévalo, Guatemala's 52nd President who has been serving since 15 January 2024, has a personal connection to Israel. Arévalo lived in Israel when his father, Juan José Arévalo, served as Guatemalan ambassador to Israel. While living in Israel, Arévalo learned to speak Hebrew and he received a bachelor's degree in sociology from the Hebrew University of Jerusalem. Bernardo later returned to work in Israel, from 1984 to 1986, as the first secretary and consul at the Guatemalan embassy in Israel.

== Trade ==
Guatemala and Israel have a Free Trade Agreement since 2024.

Israel - Guatemala trade in millions USD
	Israel imports Guatemala exports	Guatemala imports Israel exports	Total trade value
2023	3	27.7	30.7
2022	4.4	34.8	39.2
2021	4.6	30.5	35.1
2020	5.2	26.6	31.8
2019	4.2	23.7	27.9
2018	4.3	23.8	28.1
2017	3.2	26.6	29.8
2016	2.5	29.7	32.2
2015	1.8	27.4	29.2
2014	3.1	29.3	32.4
2013	2.7	29.1	31.8
2012	1.7	27.6	29.3
2011	4.8	31.1	35.9
2010	2.1	27.3	29.4
2009	4.8	23.3	28.1
2008	2.7	31.3	34
2007	3.4	26.5	29.9
2006	1	24.4	25.4
2005	1.4	31.6	33
2004	1.6	22.2	23.8
2003	2.5	11.8	14.3
2002	1.3	14.2	15.5

== Israel aid to Guatemala ==
=== MASHAV ===
Since 1962 Guatemala is one of the main recipient of aid from MASHAV. 6,000 scholarships were given to Guatemalan professionals in the fields of Health, Education, Sustainable Development, Innovation, Entrepreneurship, Public Safety, Journalism and Communication. After the eruption of volcano Fuego in 2018, Israel donated over 35 houses to affected families, and sending team of Israeli doctors. During COVID-19 Israel donated 5,000 doses of vaccine to Guatemala. In 2022 Mashav opened Center for Agricultural Modernization with Israeli technology in the ENCA Agricultural School in Barcenas, Villa Nueva.

=== IsraAID ===
IsraAID is a 2001 founded NGO from Israel and also active in Guatemala.

After the eruption of volcano Fuego in 2018, IsraAID was one of the first international teams to arrive, landing two days after the eruption. Since 2018 IsraAid mission In Guatemala switched its focus to long term programming.

=== Heroes for Life ===
Heroes for Life is a 2013 founded NGO which was founded by three officers of the Israel Defense Forces (IDF) who had served in the Duvdevan unit for eight years. Heros for Life volunteers are Israelis after IDF service.

Heros for Life are active in Guatemala since 2017.

== Jewish community in Guatemala ==
Approximately there are 1,000 Jews living in Guatemala as for 2021. The community is mostly located in Guatemala City. Sinagoga Maguen David and Sinagoga Sharei Binyamin are Orthodox synagogues, and Sinagoga Adat Israel is a reform synagogue.

== See also ==
- Foreign relations of Guatemala
- Foreign relations of Israel
- History of the Jews in Guatemala
