= Costa Rica–Guatemala relations =

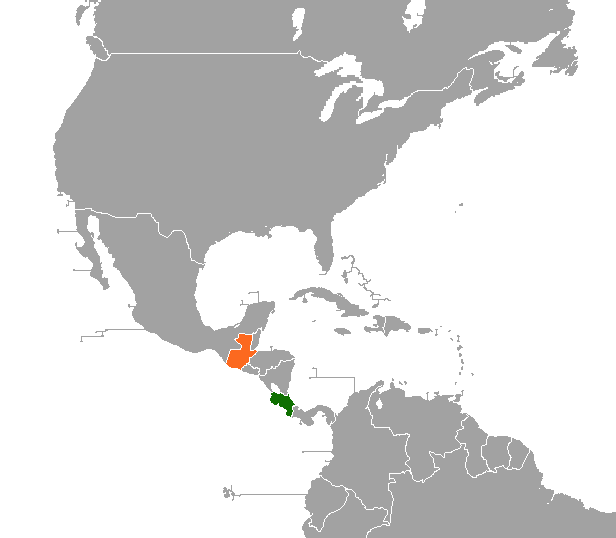

- Costa Rica: Guatemala

Costa Rica–Guatemala relations refer to the international relations that exist between Costa Rica and Guatemala.

Historically, both countries were part of the Spanish Empire until the beginning of the 19th century. Today, both countries are full members of the Rio Group, the Latin Union, the Association of Academies of the Spanish Language, the Organization of American States, the Organization of Ibero-American States, the Community of Latin American and Caribbean States, the Cairns Group, and the Group of 77.

Official relations between Costa Rica and Guatemala were formalized on August 18, 1839, with the signing of the Carrillo-Toledo Treaty of Friendship and Alliance, signed between the Head of State of Costa Rica Braulio Carrillo Colina and the Commissioner of Guatemala José Nazario Toledo. Although this treaty was never exchanged, from the moment it was signed both States maintained official relations.

== Resident diplomatic missions ==
- Costa Rica has an embassy in Guatemala City.
- Guatemala has an embassy in San José.
