= Guatemala–Haiti relations =

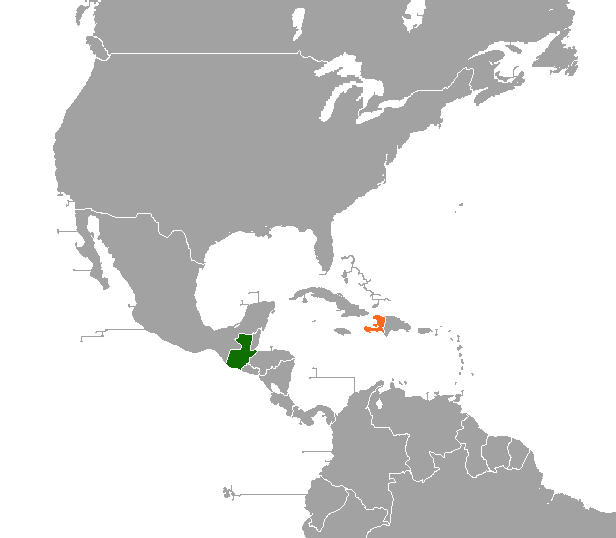

- Guatemala: Haiti

Bilateral relations between Guatemala and Haiti were established in 1948. Guatemala maintains a diplomatic consulate in the Haitian capital city of Port-au-Prince. Haiti maintains a diplomatic consulate in the Guatemalan capital city of Guatemala City.

== Military and humanitarian actions ==
On 10 October 2021, 100 Haitians were rescued from a shipping container on the side of a road in Guatemala.

On 4 and 5 January 2025, the Armed Forces of Guatemala sent 150 troops along with the El Salvadoran Armed Forces to combat Haiti's escalating gang war of its worsening crisis.
