= Guatemala–Russia relations =

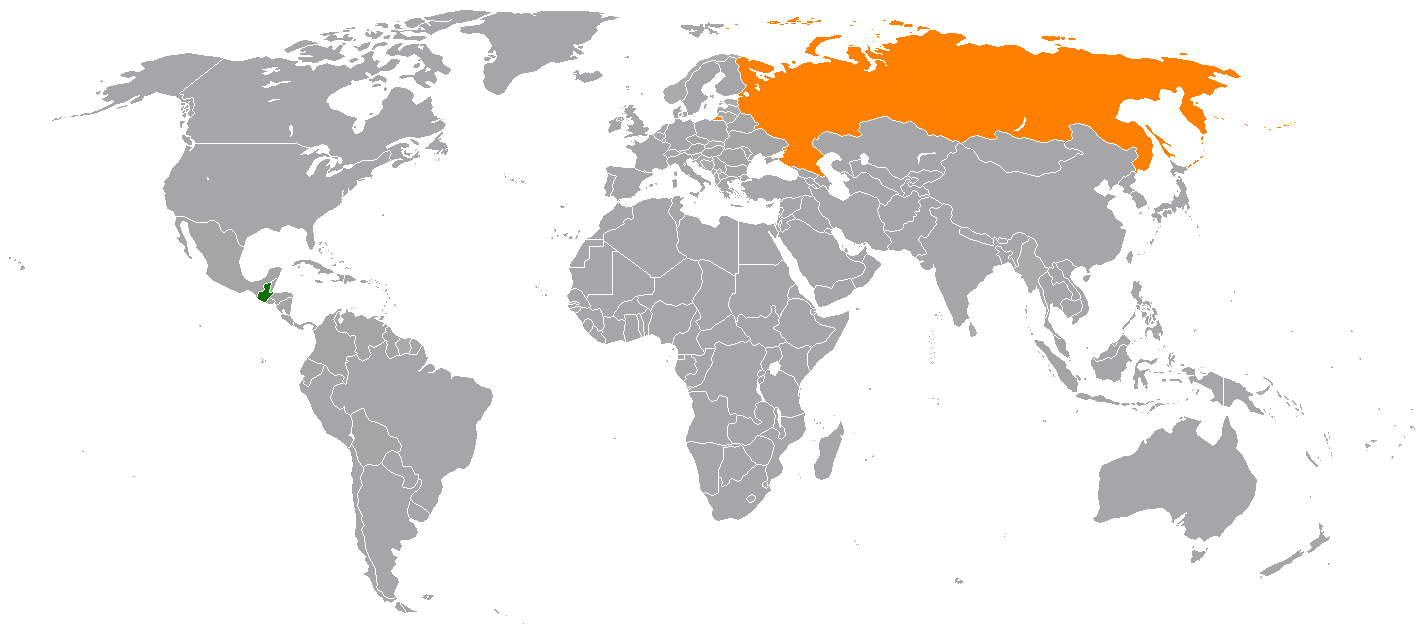
- Guatemala: Russia

The bilateral relationship between the Guatemala and the Russia dates back to 1945, when Russia was part of the Soviet Union. Relations with the modern Russian Federation were established in 1991.

== History ==
Guatemala established diplomatic relations with the Soviet Union on April 19, 1945, during the Cold War era. Despite the tensions of the period, these relations were maintained until the early 1960s when they were "frozen" due to the armed conflict in Guatemala. However, the diplomatic ties were never officially severed. On January 4, 1991, following the dissolution of the Soviet Union, Guatemala and the newly established Russian Federation signed a joint communiqué, agreeing to exchange diplomatic missions and thus formally renewing their relations.

In 1995, Guatemala opened its first embassy in Moscow, a significant step in solidifying the relationship between the two nations. Initially, Russia was represented in Guatemala through its embassy in Costa Rica. However, recognizing the importance of direct diplomatic presence, Russia opened its embassy in Guatemala City in 2007.

Throughout the post-Cold War era, the Russian Federation, along with other international entities, played a supportive role in the peace process in Guatemala, which culminated in the signing of the Guatemala Peace Accords in 1996. This support marked a new phase of cooperation between the two countries, focusing on peaceful development and bilateral cooperation.

== Economic relations ==
The economic relationship between Guatemala and Russia has been relatively modest but marked by efforts to expand trade and investment. Guatemala exports primarily agricultural products such as coffee, bananas, and sugar to Russia. In return, Russia exports machinery, chemicals, and other industrial products to Guatemala. Both countries have expressed interest in increasing trade volumes and diversifying the range of traded goods.

== Cultural relations ==
Cultural exchanges between Guatemala and Russia have been limited but present. The two countries have occasionally participated in cultural events promoting mutual understanding. Russia has shown interest in supporting cultural and educational programs in Guatemala, including Russian language courses and academic exchanges.

== High-level visits ==
Several high-level visits have occurred between the two nations, underscoring the importance of diplomatic relations. In 2007, Russian president Vladimir Putin visited Guatemala, meeting with Guatemalan president Óscar Berger in the National Palace in Guatemala City. This visit highlighted the commitment of both nations to strengthening their bilateral ties.

== Resident diplomatic missions ==
- Guatemala has an embassy in Moscow.
- Russia has an embassy in Guatemala City.

== See also ==
- Foreign relations of Guatemala
- Foreign relations of Russia
- List of ambassadors of Russia to Guatemala
