= Central America-4 passport =

Common-design passport

The Central America-4 passport (also called the Central American passport) is a common-design passport issued by the Central America-4 Border Control Agreement member states (El Salvador, Guatemala, Honduras, and Nicaragua). Although the design had been in use by Nicaragua and El Salvador since the mid-1990s, it became the norm for the CA-4 in January 2006. The main features are the navy blue cover with the words "Centroamérica" and a map of Central America, with the territory of the issuing country highlighted in gold (in place of the individual nations' coats of arms). Costa Rica, not a C-4 Agreement member, also uses a passport with the inscription "América Central", retained from the Federal Republic of Central America and included in its coat of arms. Despite their similar appearances, passports from each of the C-4 member countries do not have equal mobility rankings. El Salvador's passport ranks 36th on the Henley visa restrictions index and allows visa free or visa on entry access to 136 countries and territories, while Nicaragua's passport ranks 42nd and allows access to 128.

== Gallery of CA-4 passports ==
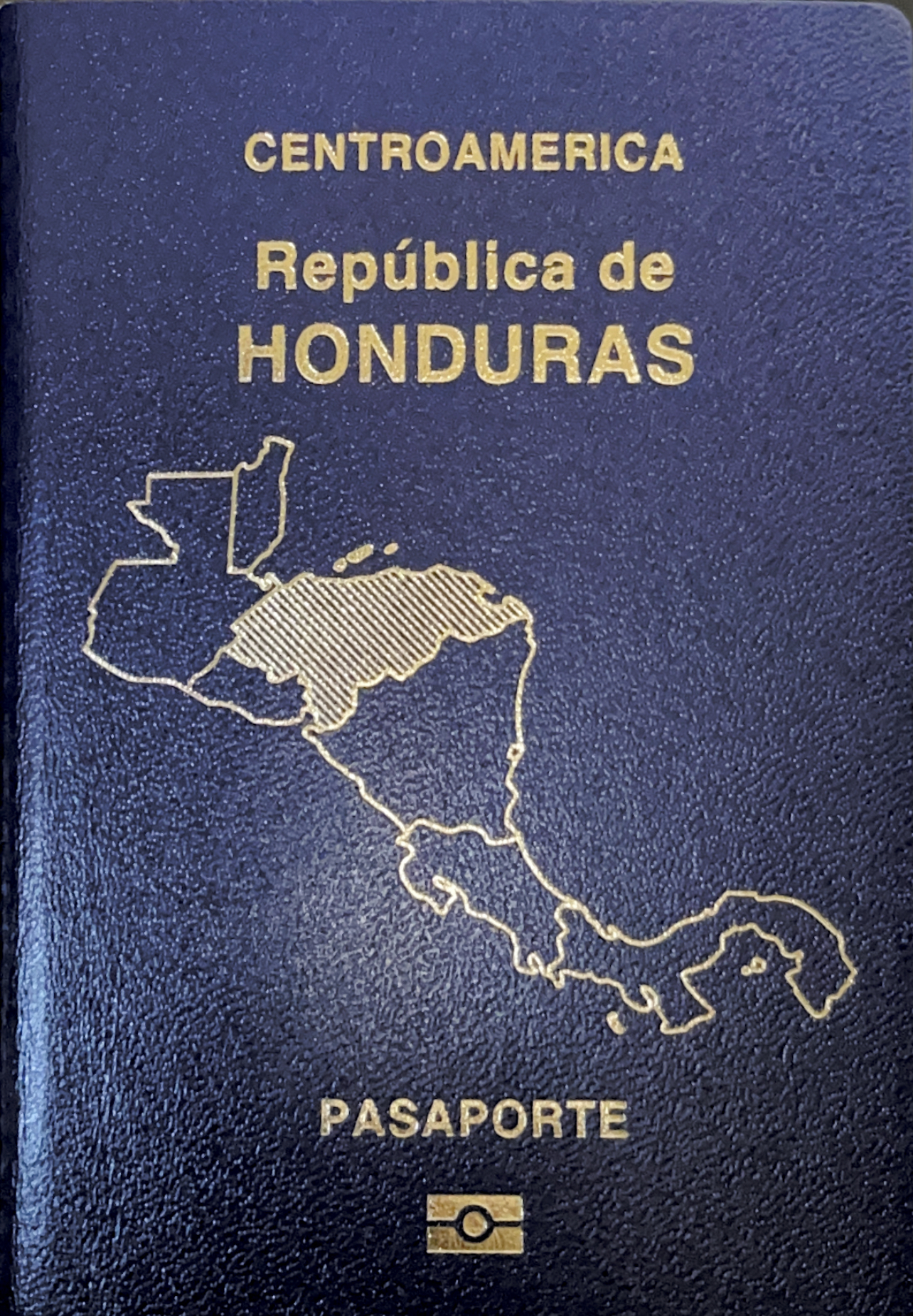
Honduran passport

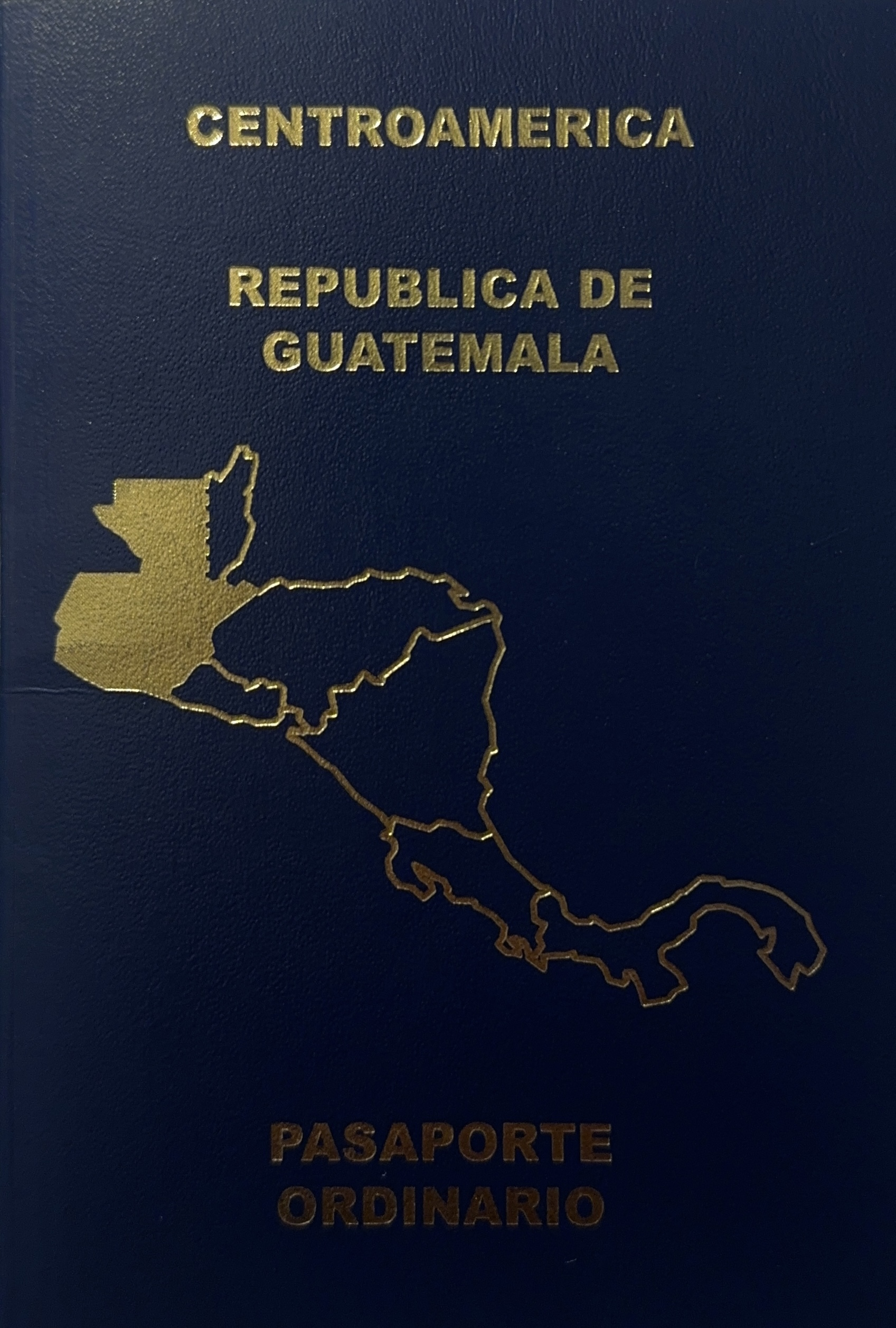
Guatemalan passport

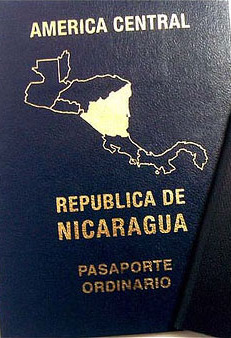
Nicaraguan passport

== See also ==
- Central America-4 Border Control Agreement
- Central American Integration System
- Visa policy of El Salvador
- Visa policy of Guatemala
- Visa policy of Honduras
- Visa policy of Nicaragua
