= Guatemalan passport =

Passport issued to Guatemalan citizens

Guatemalan passport; Pasaporte guatemalteco
- Front cover of the current Guatemalan passport
- Type: Passport
- Issued by: Instituto Guatemalteco de Migración
- Purpose: Identification & Travel
- Eligibility: Guatemalan citizenship
- Expiration: 10 years after issuance for individuals aged 18 and above; 5 years for citizens 17 and under.
- Cost: USD85 for 10 years / USD50 for 5 years

Guatemalan passports (Spanish: Pasaporte guatemalteco) are issued to Guatemalan citizens to travel outside Guatemala. As of 1 February 2024, Guatemalan citizens had visa-free or visa on arrival access to 137 countries and territories, ranking the Guatemalan passport 38th in terms of travel freedom according to the Henley visa restrictions index.

== Appearance ==
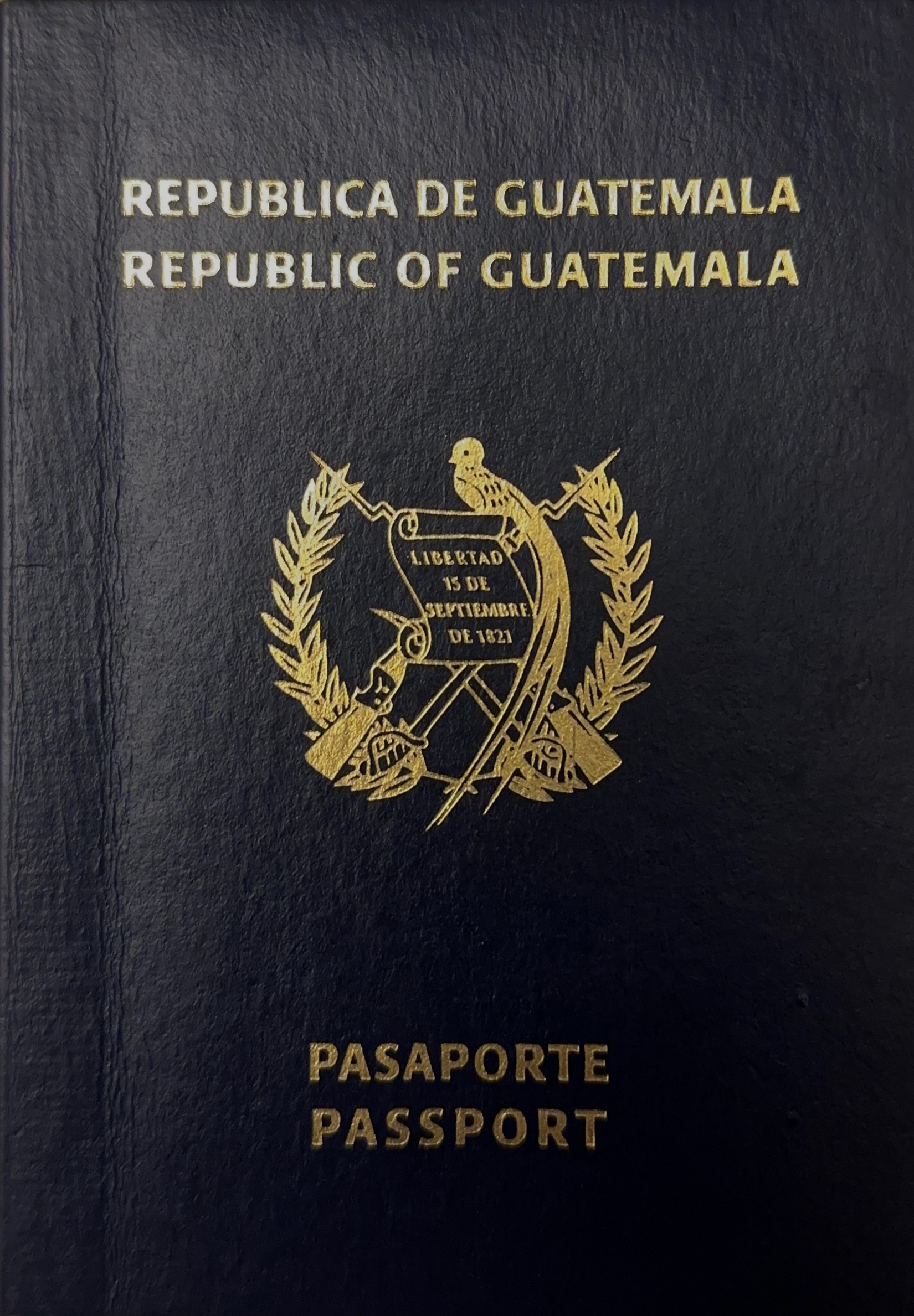
Former cover of the Guatemalan passport, in use until 2006.

Previously, like all Central American passports, the cover had navy with gold fonts stating the official name of the country in Spanish and in English, the Emblem of Guatemala in the middle and the words Pasaporte and Passport at the bottom.

Since 2006, there is now a newer version of the cover, which has kept many of the old features. The main difference is that now at the top it has the words Centro America and in the middle, instead of the coat of arms, a map of Central America is displayed with the Guatemalan territory shaded. At the bottom the wording changed to depict the type of passport.

The first page remains the same with the wording in Spanish, English, and the emblem. Passports have a validity of five years or ten years.

=== Security features ===
The Guatemalan passport contains many security features in it like colored fibers embedded in the pages, a watermark on all pages, and others. Like in the quetzal bills, the passport has an outline of an image on one side and on the other side the image is colored; and when a page is held up against light, the observer is able to see the color on the white outline.

Guatemalan passports are machine readable and contain a PDF417 2D barcode with the holder's biometric information. Because of this detail, no attempts have been made to also include the RFID chip yet.

The passport issuing authority is the Dirección General de Migración (General Immigration Directorship), a dependency of the Ministerio de Gobernación (Ministry of the Interior).

== Types of Passports ==
- Ordinarios (Personal) - Issued to Guatemalan citizens for general travel and are requested through the General Immigration Directorship.
- Oficiales (Official) - Issued to Guatemalan employed officials who are holding an office in the government and represent the country. These passports are requested through the General Immigration Directorship.
- Diplomaticos (Diplomatic) - Issued to Guatemalan high-ranking officials that are employed by the government. These passports need to be requested through the Ministerio de Relaciones Exteriores (Ministry of Foreign Affairs)
- Temporales (Temporal) - Issued only to government officials or diplomats who represent the country for a specified period of time.

== See also ==
- Central America-4 passport
- Visa requirements for Guatemalan citizens
- Guatemalan CID card
