= List of diplomatic missions of Guatemala =

Guatemala maintains diplomatic missions across the world. It is also one of the more significant countries in the world which maintains an embassy in Taipei instead of Beijing.

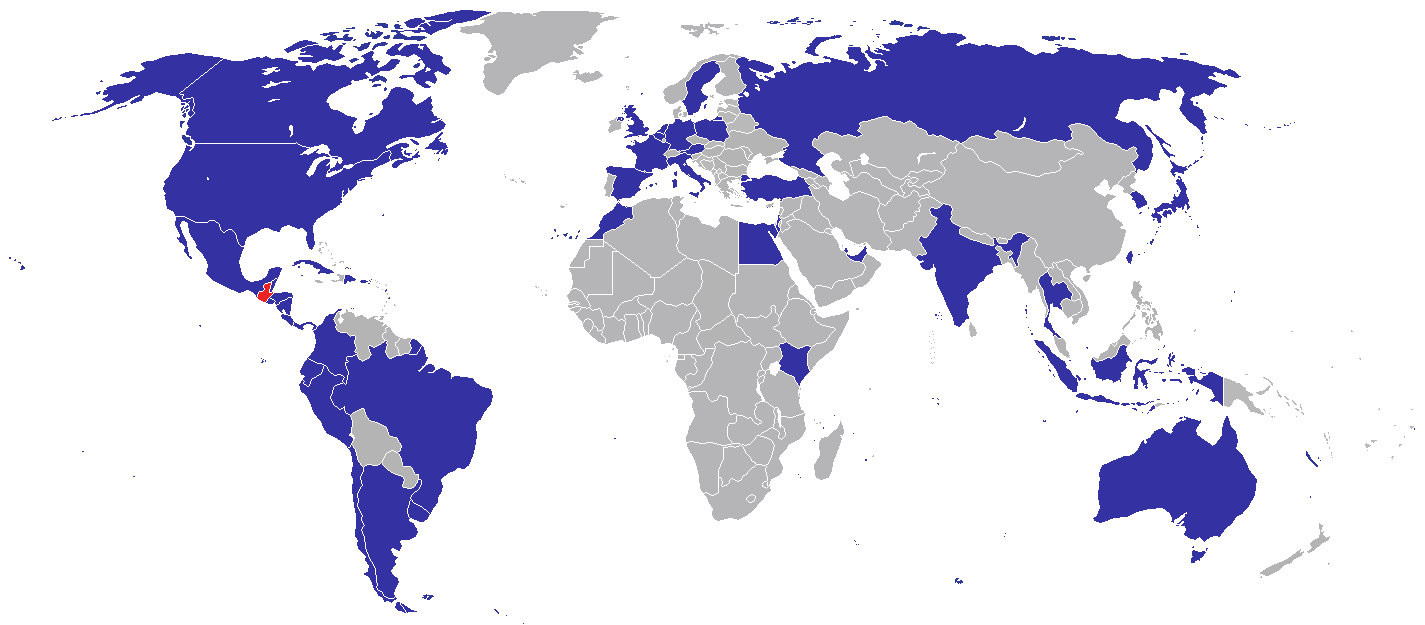
Countries hosting a Guatemalan diplomatic mission.

== Current missions ==
=== Africa ===
Host country	Host city	Mission	Concurrent accreditation	Ref.
Egypt	Cairo	Embassy	Countries: Jordan; Lebanon; Libya; Oman	
Kenya	Nairobi	Embassy	Multilateral Organizations: United Nations; United Nations Environment Programme; United Nations Human Settlements Programme	
Morocco	Rabat	Embassy	Countries: Ethiopia; Cameroon; Gabon; Ghana; Ivory Coast; Nigeria; Senegal; South Africa	
Morocco	Dahkla	Consulate-General	Countries: Ethiopia; Cameroon; Gabon; Ghana; Ivory Coast; Nigeria; Senegal; South Africa	

=== Americas ===
Host country	Host city	Mission	Concurrent accreditation	Ref.
Argentina	Buenos Aires	Embassy		
Belize	Belize City	Embassy		
Belize	Benque Viejo del Carmen	Consulate-General		
Brazil	Brasília	Embassy		
Canada	Ottawa	Embassy		
Canada	Montreal	Consulate-General		
Canada	Toronto	Consulate-General		
Canada	Vancouver	Consulate-General		
Chile	Santiago de Chile	Embassy	Countries: Paraguay	
Colombia	Bogotá	Embassy		
Costa Rica	San José	Embassy		
Cuba	Havana	Embassy		
Dominican Republic	Santo Domingo	Embassy	Countries: Haiti	
Ecuador	Quito	Embassy		
El Salvador	San Salvador	Embassy		
Honduras	Tegucigalpa	Embassy		
Honduras	San Pedro Sula	Consulate-General		
Mexico	Mexico City	Embassy		
Mexico	Mexico City	Consulate-General		
Mexico	Cancún (Quintana Roo)	Consulate-General		
Mexico	Ciudad Juárez (Chihuahua)	Consulate-General		
Mexico	Monterrey (Nuevo León)	Consulate-General		
Mexico	Oaxaca City (Oaxaca)	Consulate-General		
Mexico	San Luis Potosí City (San Luis Potosí)	Consulate-General		
Mexico	Tapachula (Chiapas)	Consulate-General		
Mexico	Tenosique (Tabasco)	Consulate-General		
Mexico	Tijuana (Baja California)	Consulate-General		
Mexico	Tuxtla Gutiérrez (Chiapas)	Consulate-General		
Mexico	Acayucan (Veracruz)	Consulate		
Mexico	Arriaga (Chiapas)	Consulate		
Mexico	Comitán (Chiapas)	Consulate		
Mexico	Ciudad Hidalgo (Chiapas)	Consulate		
Nicaragua	Managua	Embassy		
Panama	Panama City	Embassy	Countries: Bahamas; Jamaica; Saint Kitts and Nevis; Trinidad and Tobago	
Peru	Lima	Embassy	Countries: Bolivia	
United States	Washington, D.C.	Embassy		
United States	Atlanta (Georgia)	Consulate-General		
United States	Chicago (Illinois)	Consulate-General		
United States	Columbus (Ohio)	Consulate-General		
United States	Denver (Colorado)	Consulate-General		
United States	Houston (Texas)	Consulate-General		
United States	Las Vegas (Nevada)	Consulate-General		
United States	Los Angeles (California)	Consulate-General		
United States	Miami (Florida)	Consulate-General		
United States	Nashville (Tennessee)	Consulate-General		
United States	New York City (New York)	Consulate-General		
United States	Oklahoma City (Oklahoma)	Consulate-General		
United States	Omaha (Nebraska)	Consulate-General		
United States	Philadelphia (Pennsylvania)	Consulate-General		
United States	Phoenix (Arizona)	Consulate-General		
United States	Providence (Rhode Island)	Consulate-General		
United States	Raleigh (North Carolina)	Consulate-General		
United States	Rockville (Maryland)	Consulate-General		
United States	San Francisco (California)	Consulate-General		
United States	Seattle (Washington)	Consulate-General		
United States	Dallas (Texas)	Consulate		
United States	Del Rio (Texas)	Consulate		
United States	Lake Worth (Florida)	Consulate		
United States	McAllen (Texas)	Consulate		
United States	Riverhead (New York)	Consulate		
United States	San Bernardino (California)	Consulate		
United States	Tucson (Arizona)	Consulate		
Uruguay	Montevideo	Embassy		

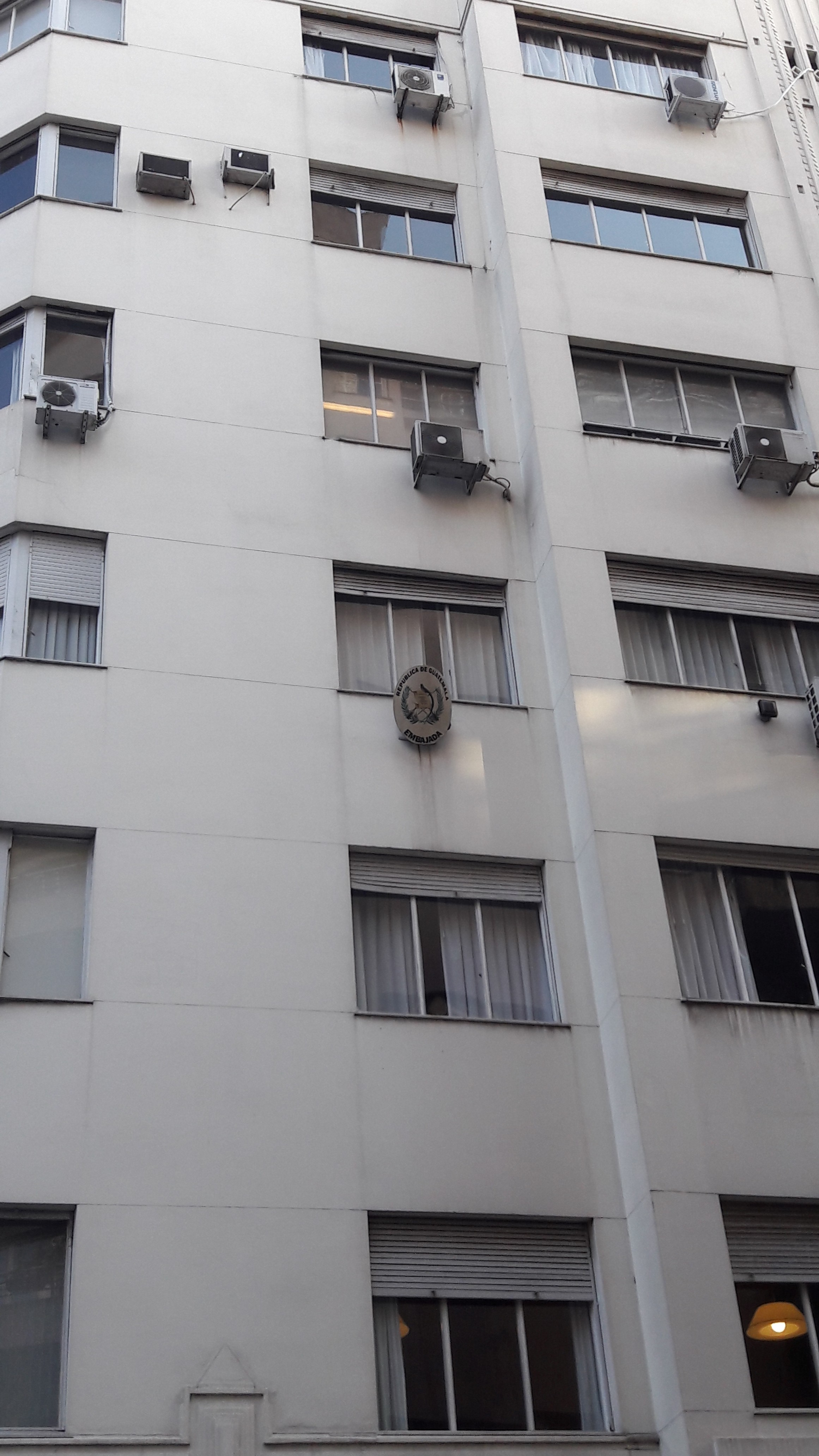
Embassy in Buenos Aires

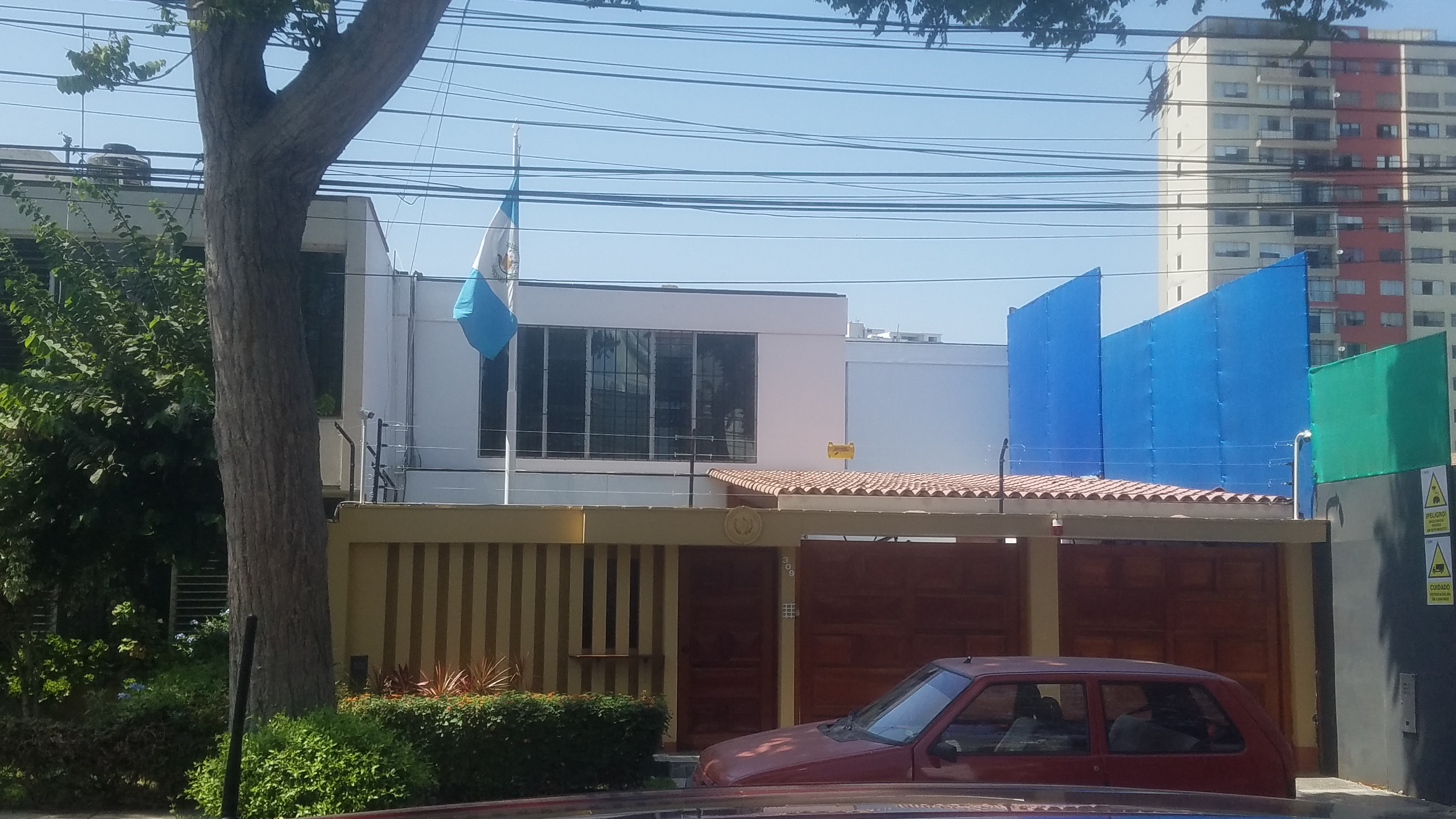
Embassy in Lima

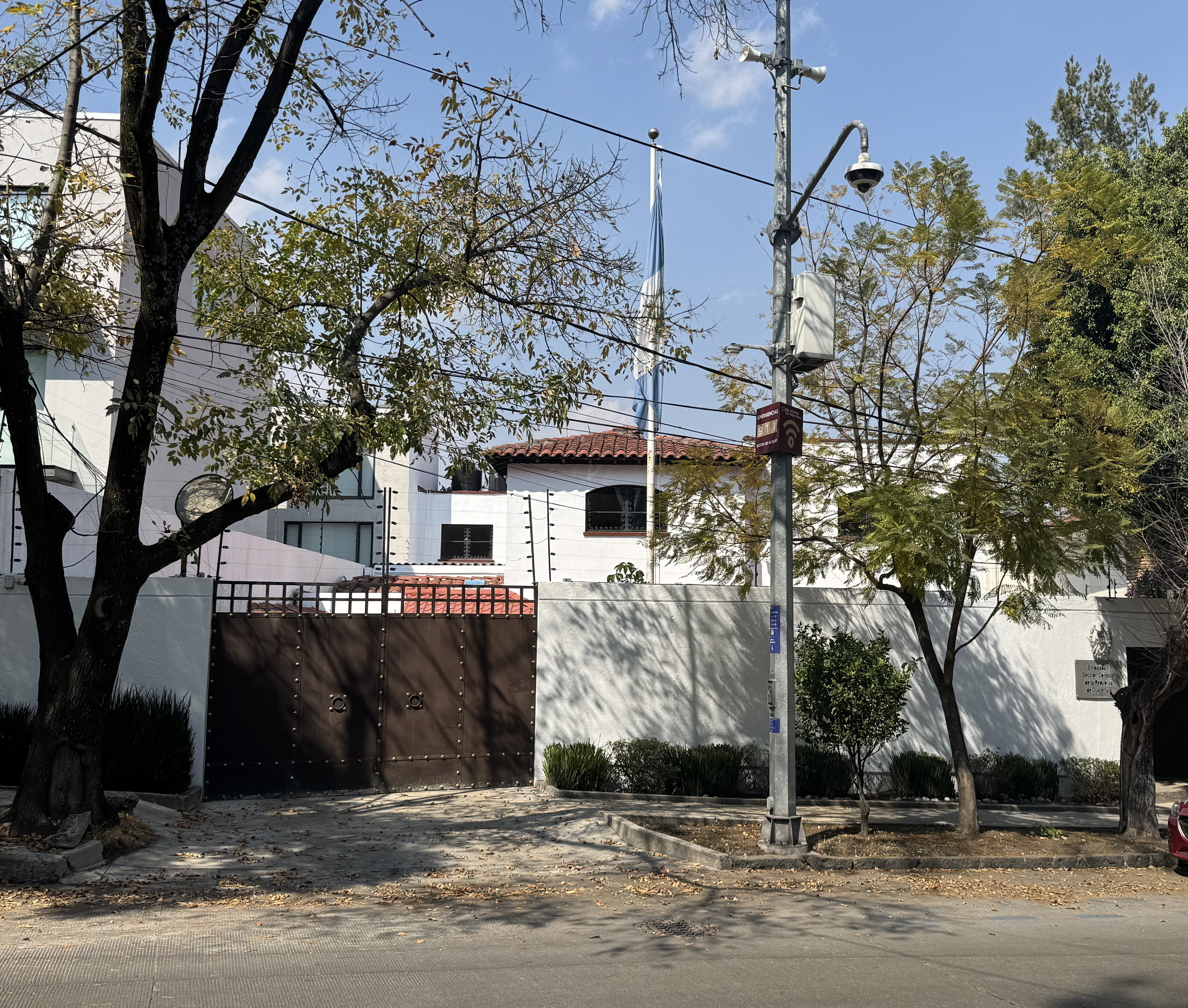
Embassy in Mexico City

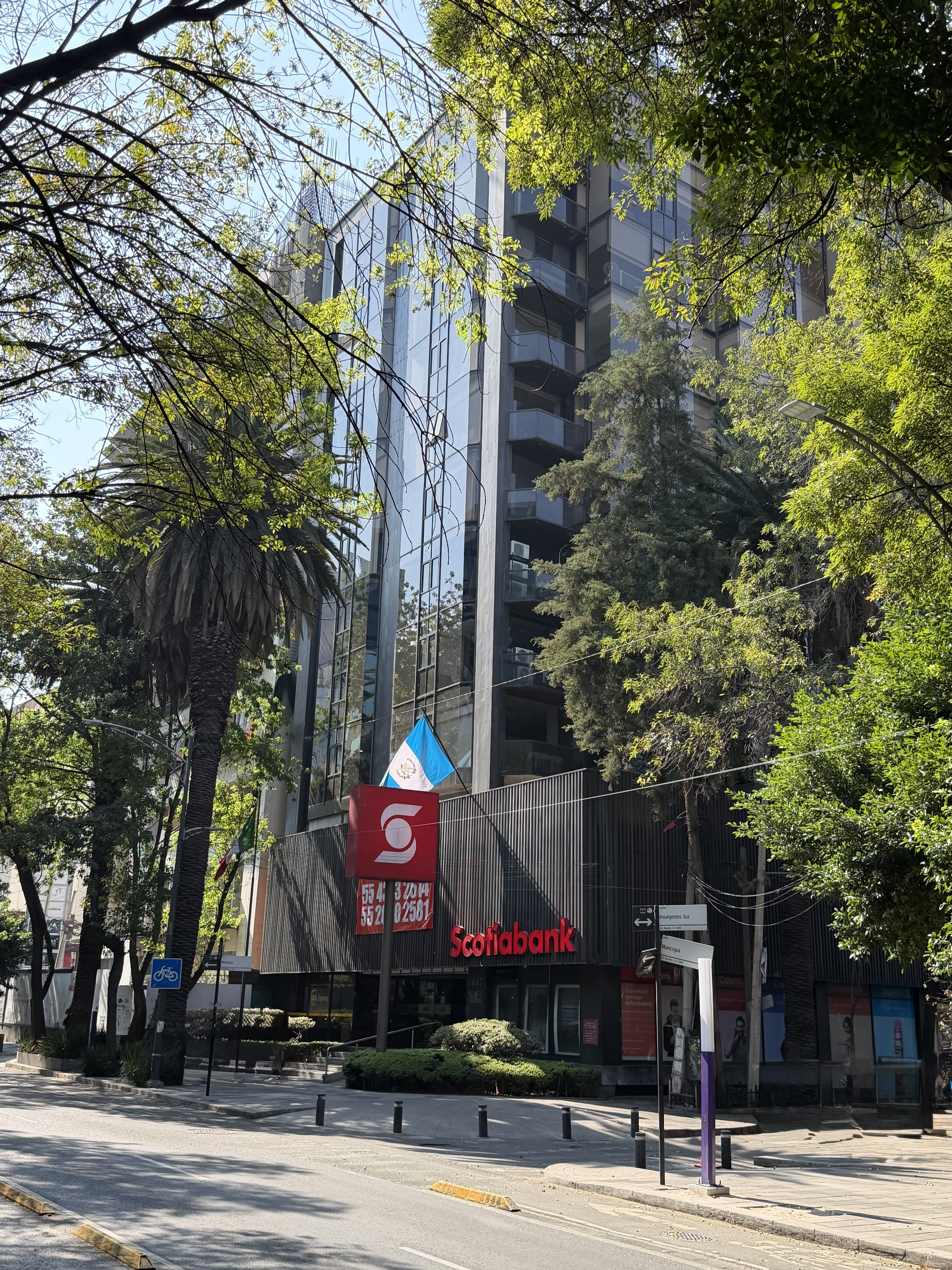
Building hosting the Consulate-General in Mexico City

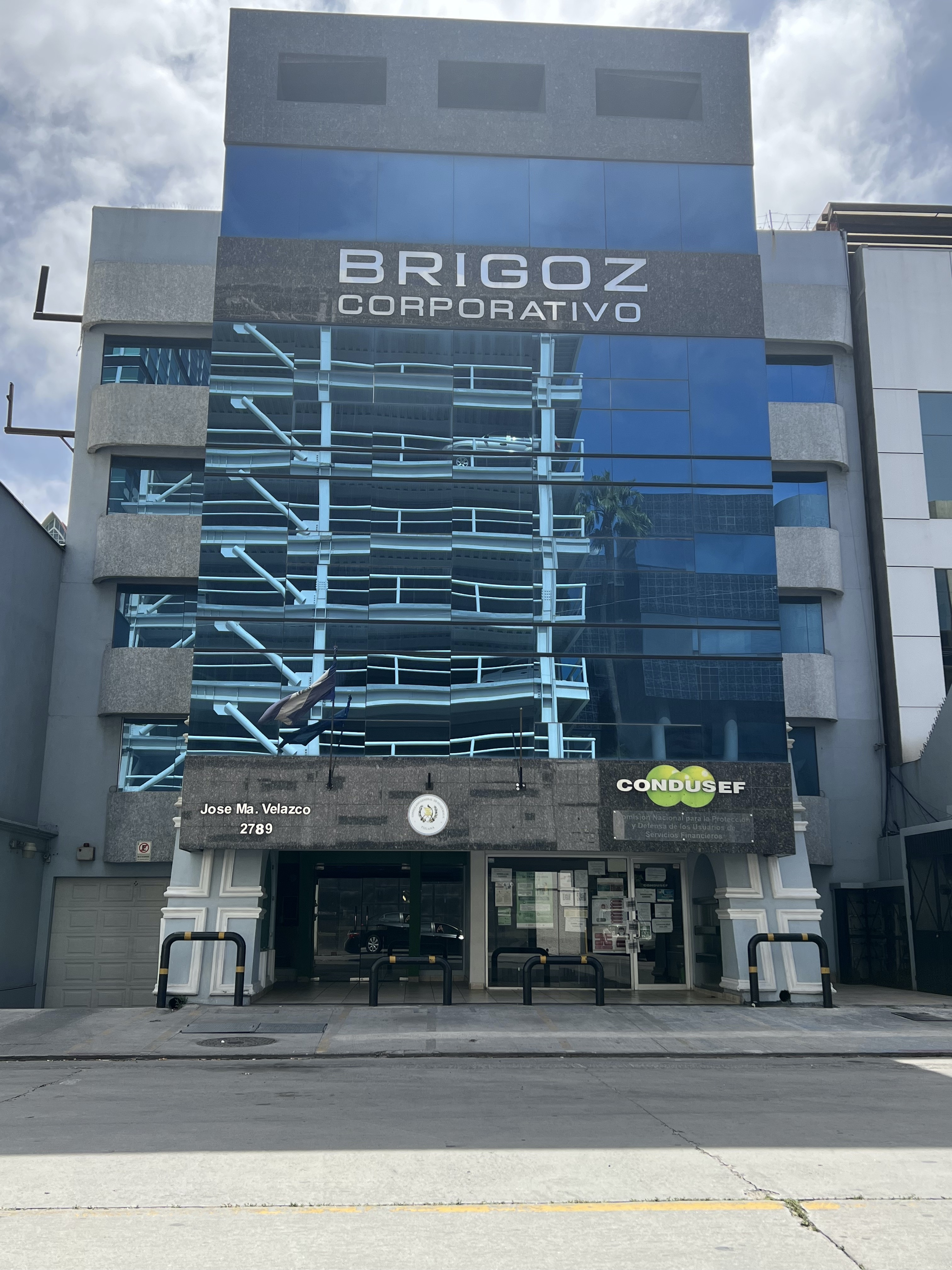
Building hosting the Consulate-General in Tijuana

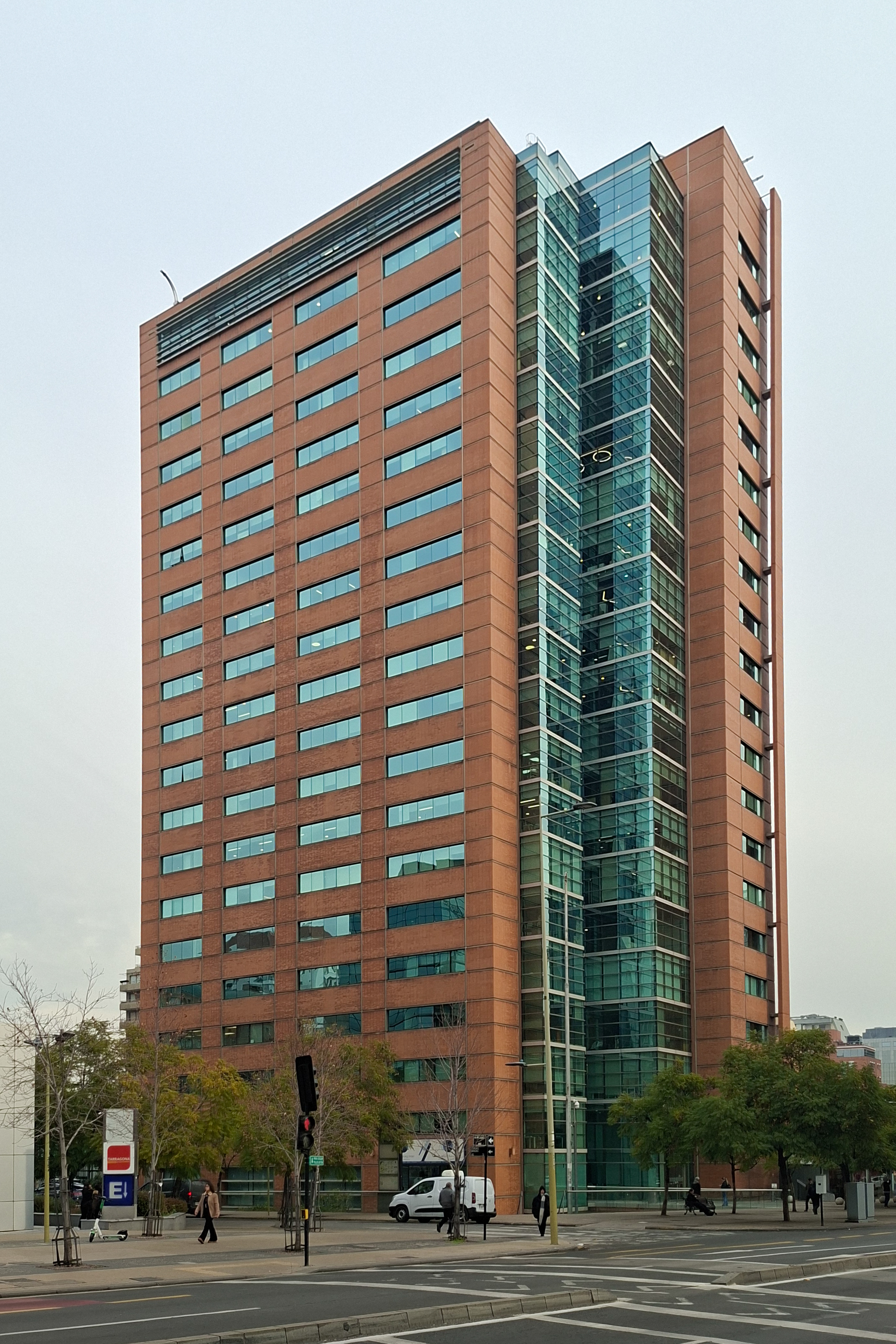
Building hosting the Embassy in Santiago

Embassy in Santo Domingo

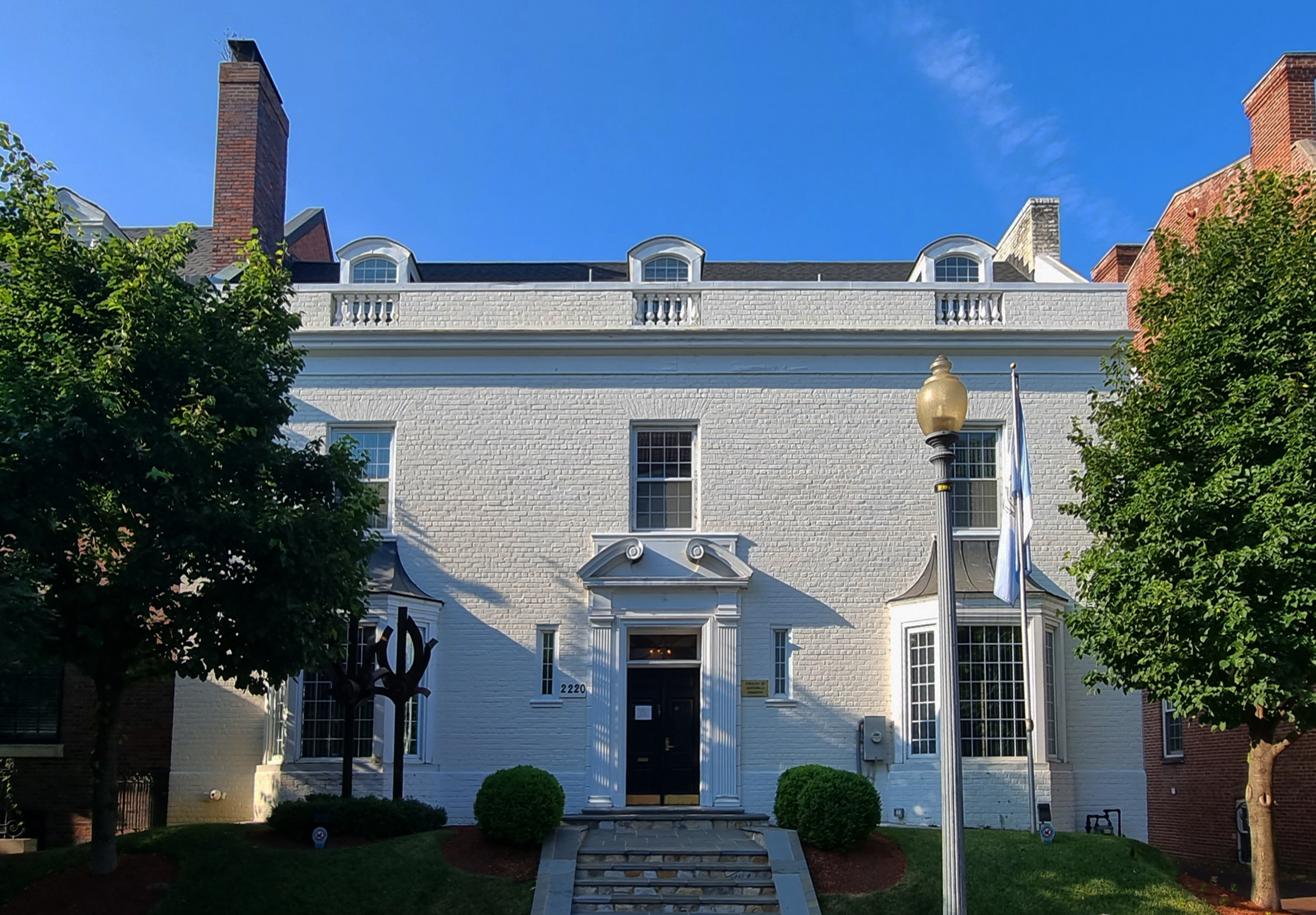
Embassy in Washington, D.C.

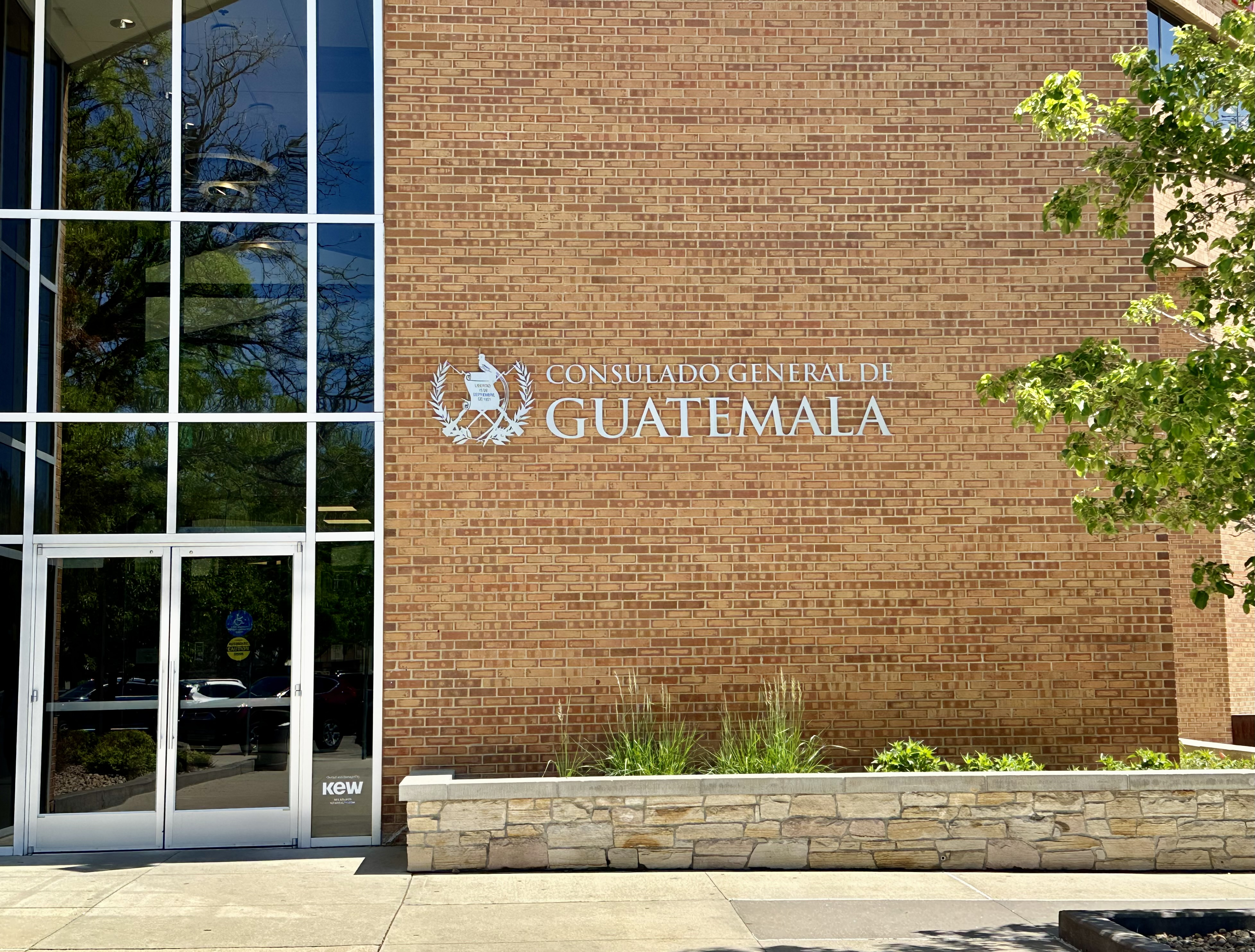
Consulate-General in Denver

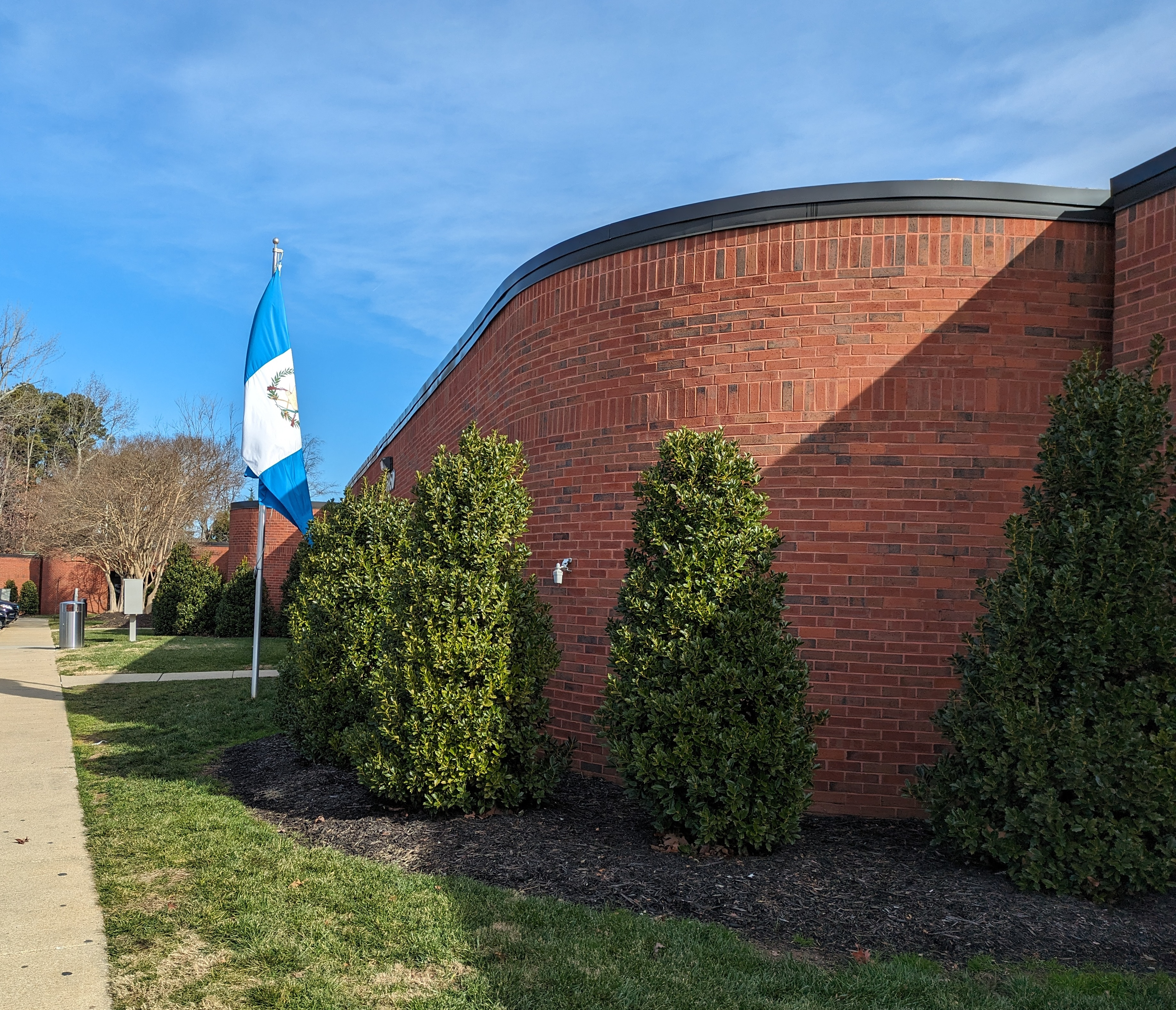
Consulate-General in Raleigh

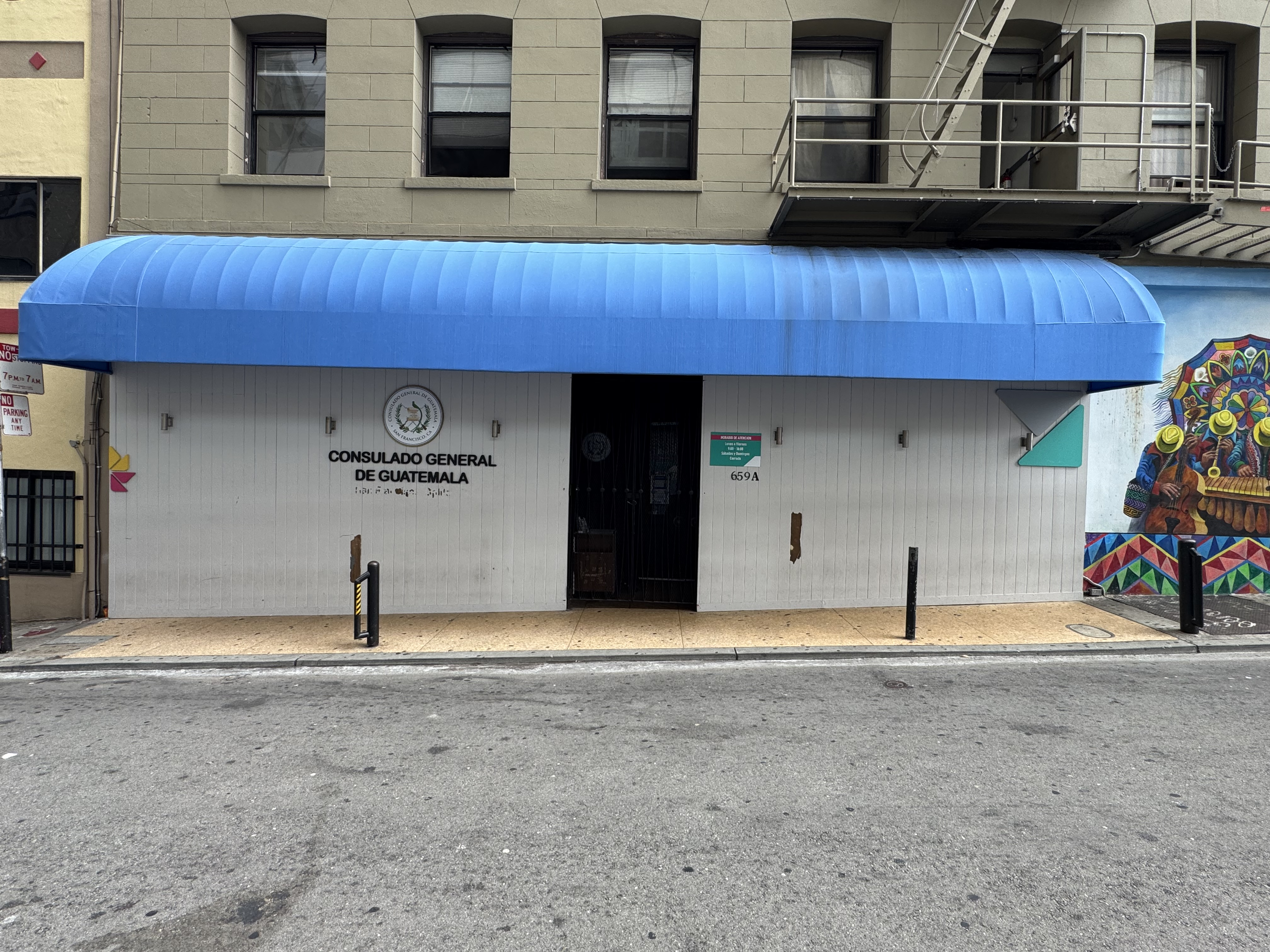
Consulate-General in San Francisco

=== Asia ===
Host country	Host city	Mission	Concurrent accreditation	Ref.
India	New Delhi	Embassy	Countries: Bangladesh; Nepal; Sri Lanka	
Indonesia	Jakarta	Embassy	Countries: Brunei; Malaysia; Singapore; Timor-Leste; Multilateral Organizations: Association of Southeast Asian Nations (Note: Accredited as an observer mission.)	
Israel	Jerusalem	Embassy	Countries: Bulgaria; Cyprus	
Japan	Tokyo	Embassy	Countries: Philippines	
Qatar	Doha	Embassy		
South Korea	Seoul	Embassy	Countries: Mongolia; North Korea	
Republic of China (Taiwan)	Taipei	Embassy	Countries: Marshall Islands; Palau	
Thailand	Bangkok	Embassy	Countries: Laos; Cambodia; Vietnam	
Turkey	Ankara	Embassy	Countries: Azerbaijan; Georgia; Kyrgyzstan; Tajikistan; Turkmenistan	
United Arab Emirates	Abu Dhabi	Embassy	Countries: Bahrain; Kuwait; Iraq; Saudi Arabia	

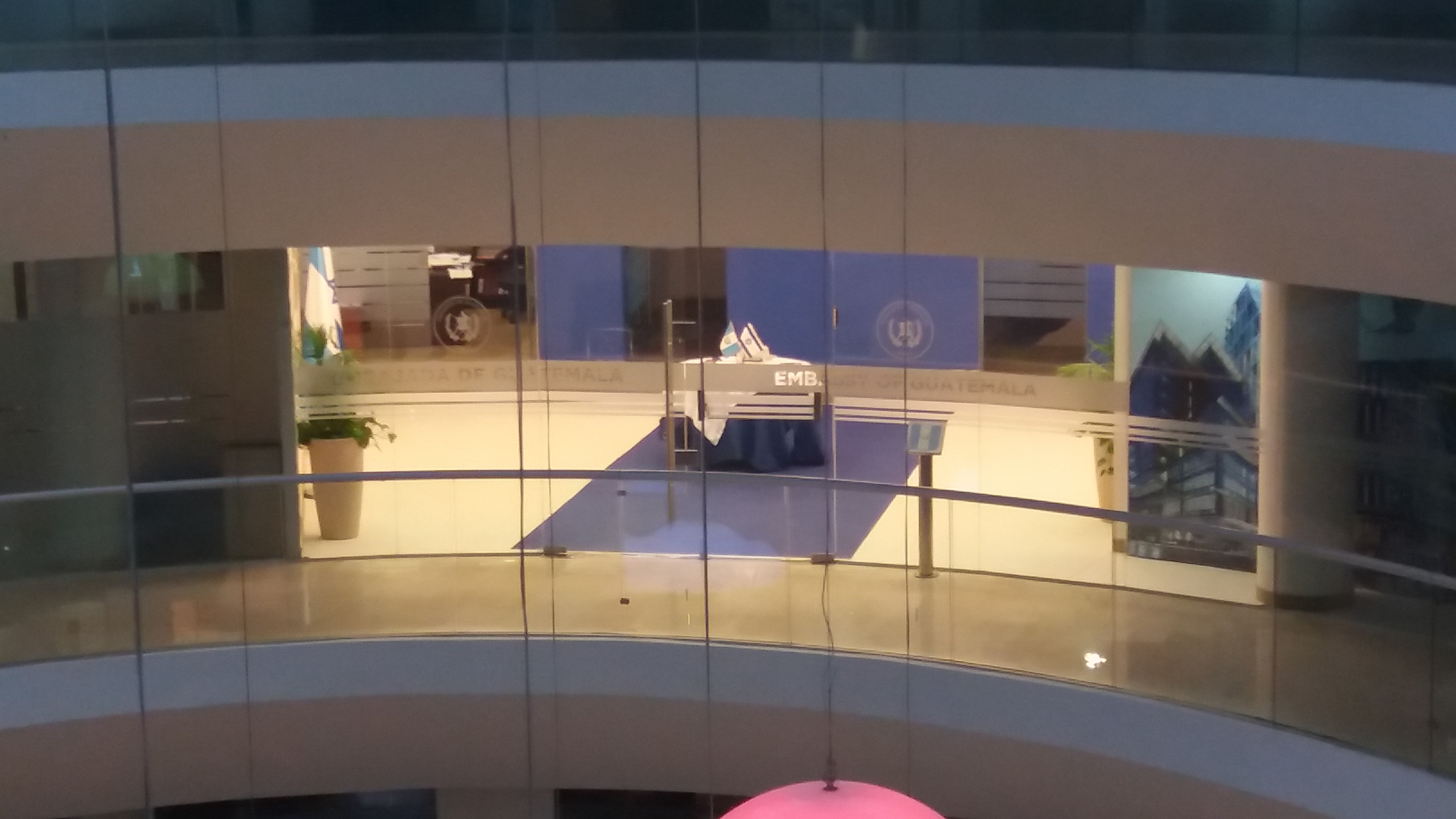
Embassy in Jerusalem

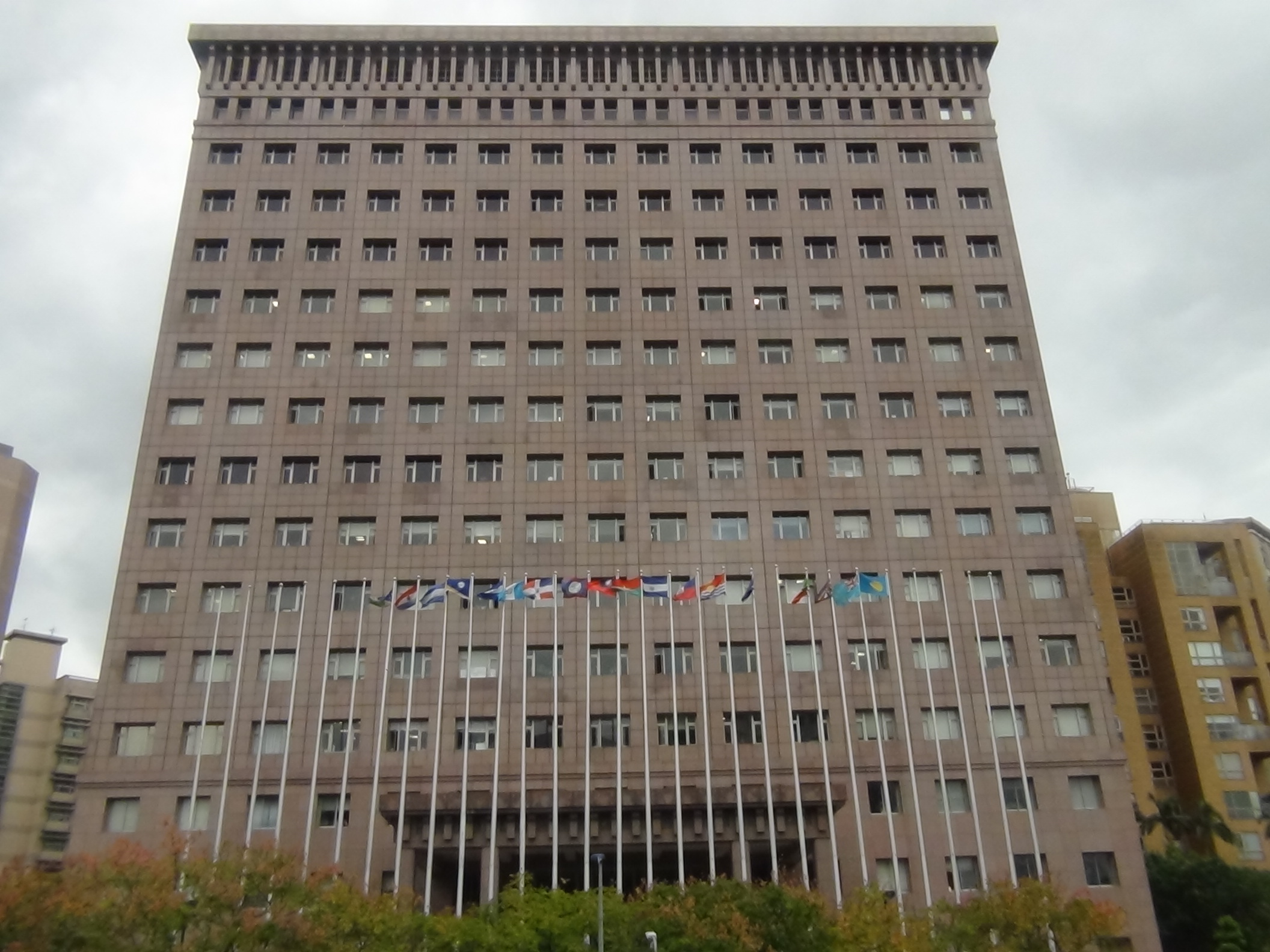
Embassy in Taipei

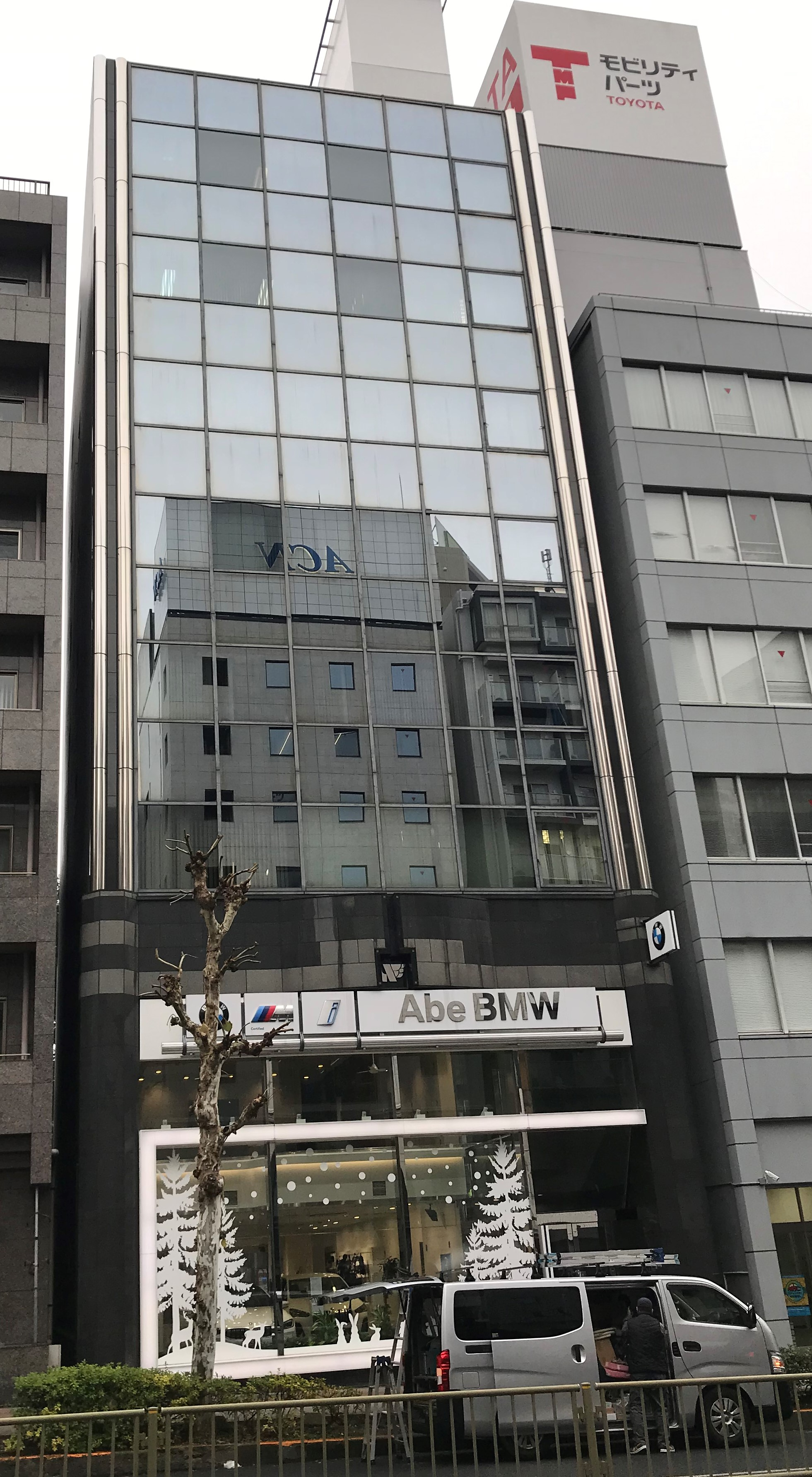
Embassy in Tokyo

=== Europe ===
Host country	Host city	Mission	Concurrent accreditation	Ref.
Austria	Vienna	Embassy	Countries: Czechia; Hungary; Romania; Slovakia; Slovenia; Multilateral Organizations: United Nations; International Atomic Energy Agency; UNIDO	
Belgium	Brussels	Embassy	Countries: Luxembourg; Multilateral Organizations: European Union	
France	Paris	Embassy	Countries: Monaco; Portugal; Switzerland; Multilateral Organizations: UNESCO	
Germany	Berlin	Embassy	Countries: Liechtenstein	
Holy See (Note: The Guatemalan Embassy to the Holy See is located outside Vatican territory in Rome.)	Rome	Embassy	Countries: Greece; Malta; Sovereign entity: Sovereign Military Order of Malta	
Italy	Rome	Embassy	Countries: San Marino; Serbia; Multilateral Organizations: Food and Agriculture Organization; International Fund for Agricultural Development; World Food Programme	
Netherlands	The Hague	Embassy	Multilateral Organizations: Organisation for the Prohibition of Chemical Weapons	
Poland	Warsaw	Embassy	Countries: Estonia; Latvia; Lithuania; Ukraine	
Russia	Moscow	Embassy	Countries: Armenia; Belarus; Kazakhstan; Moldova	
Spain	Madrid	Embassy	Countries: Andorra	
Sweden	Stockholm	Embassy	Countries: Denmark; Finland; Norway	
United Kingdom	London	Embassy	Countries: Ireland; Mozambique; Multilateral Organizations: International Maritime Organization; International Sugar Organization	

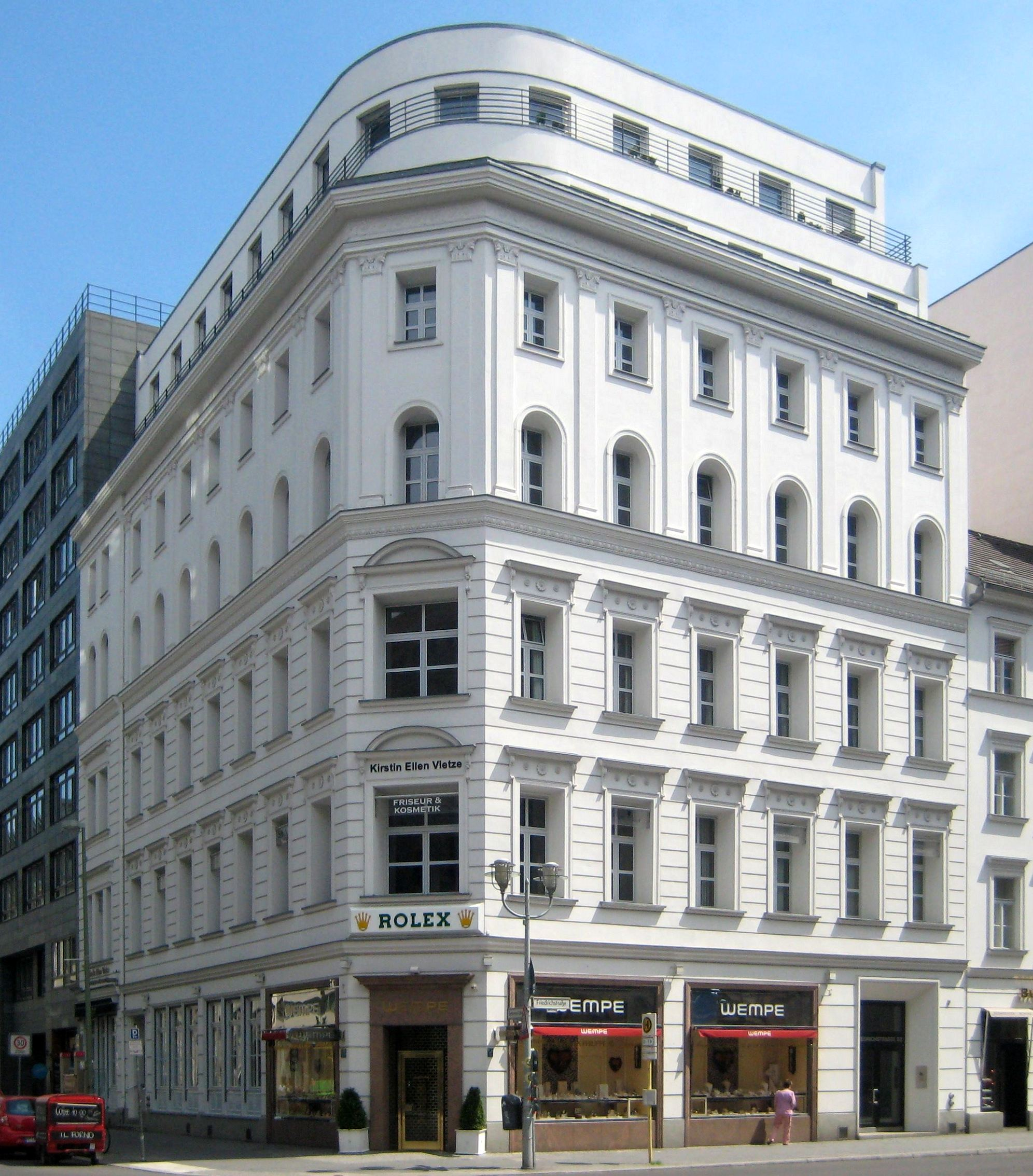
Building hosting the Embassy in Berlin

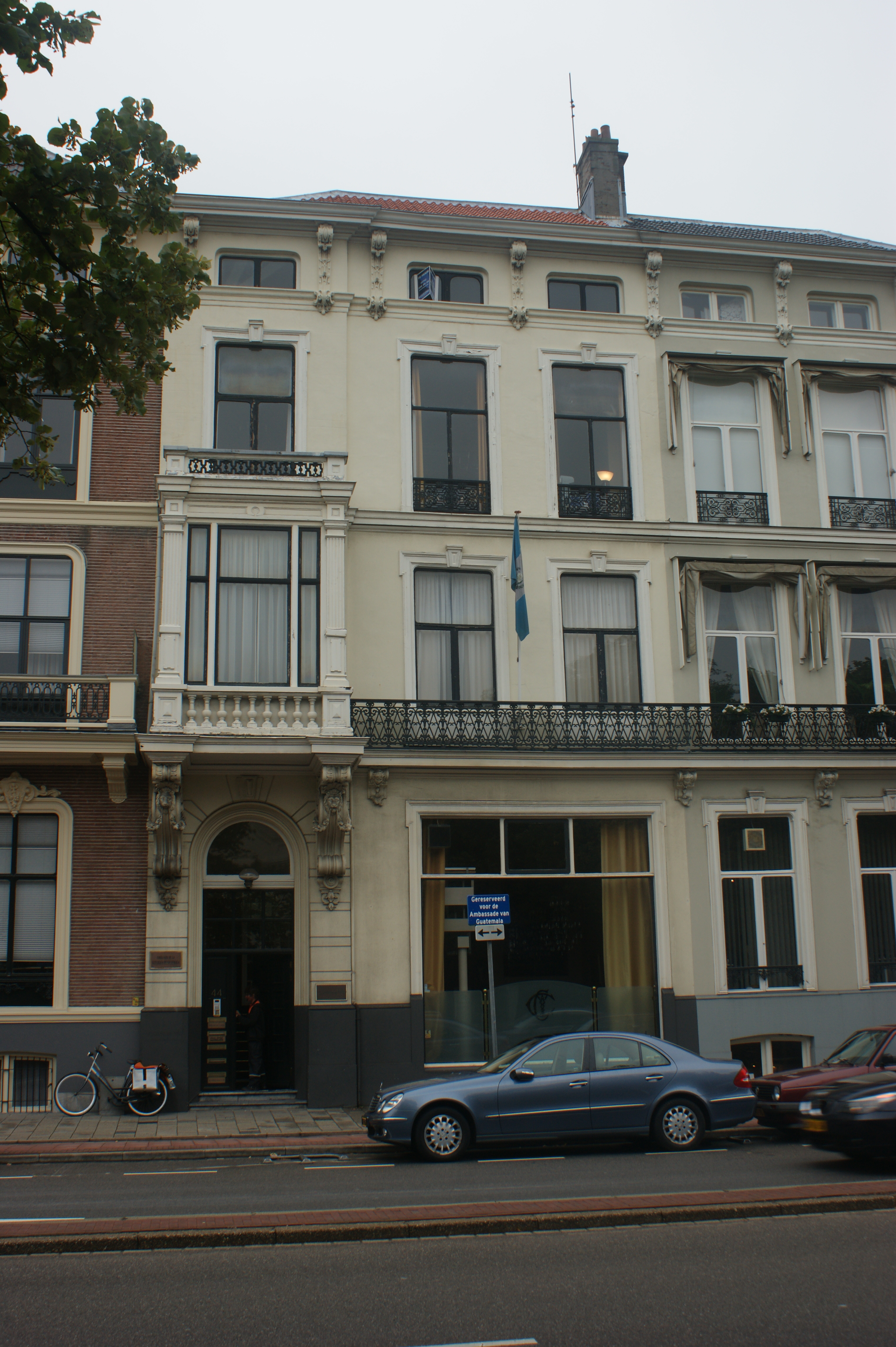
Embassy in The Hague

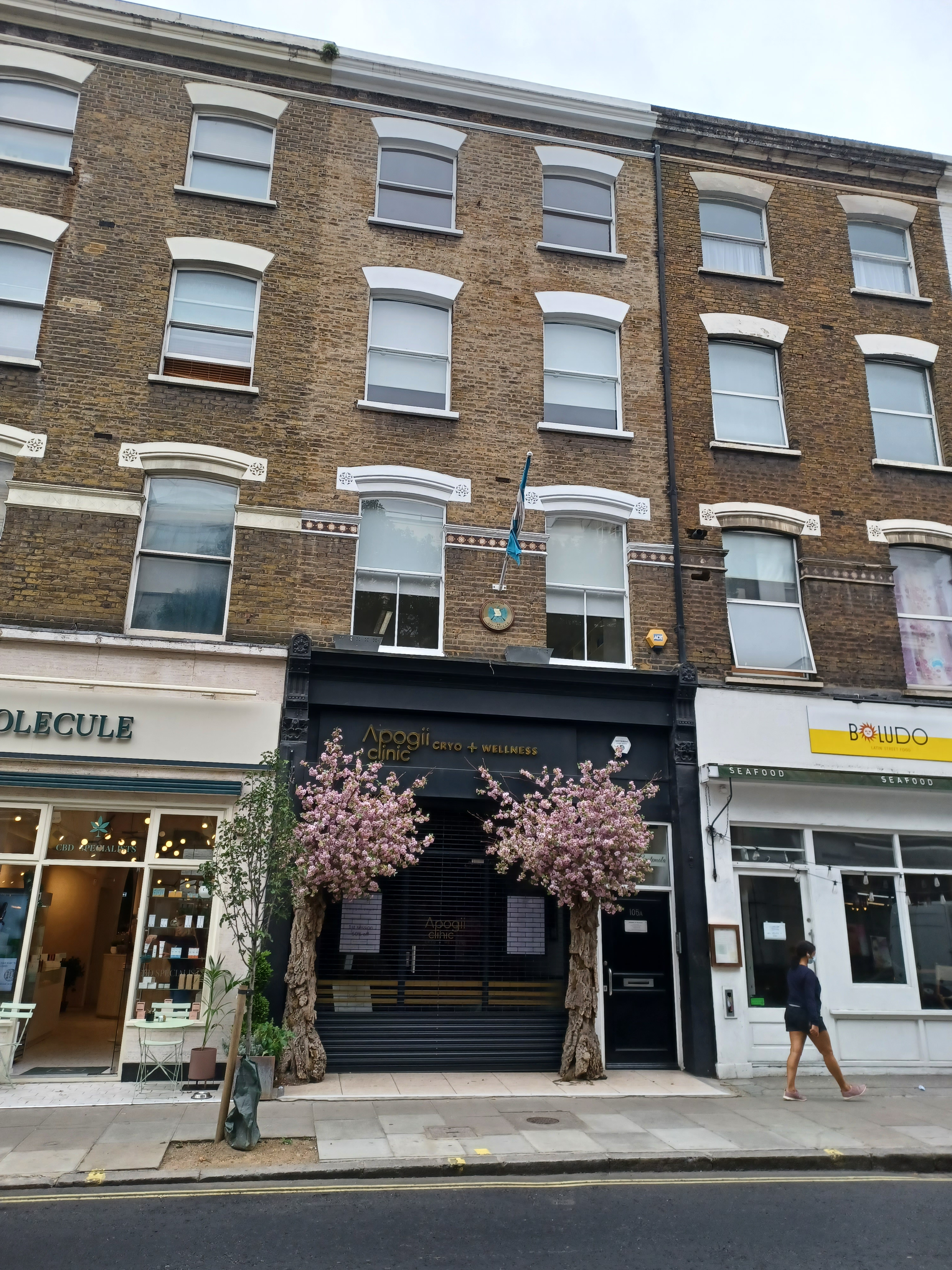
Embassy in London

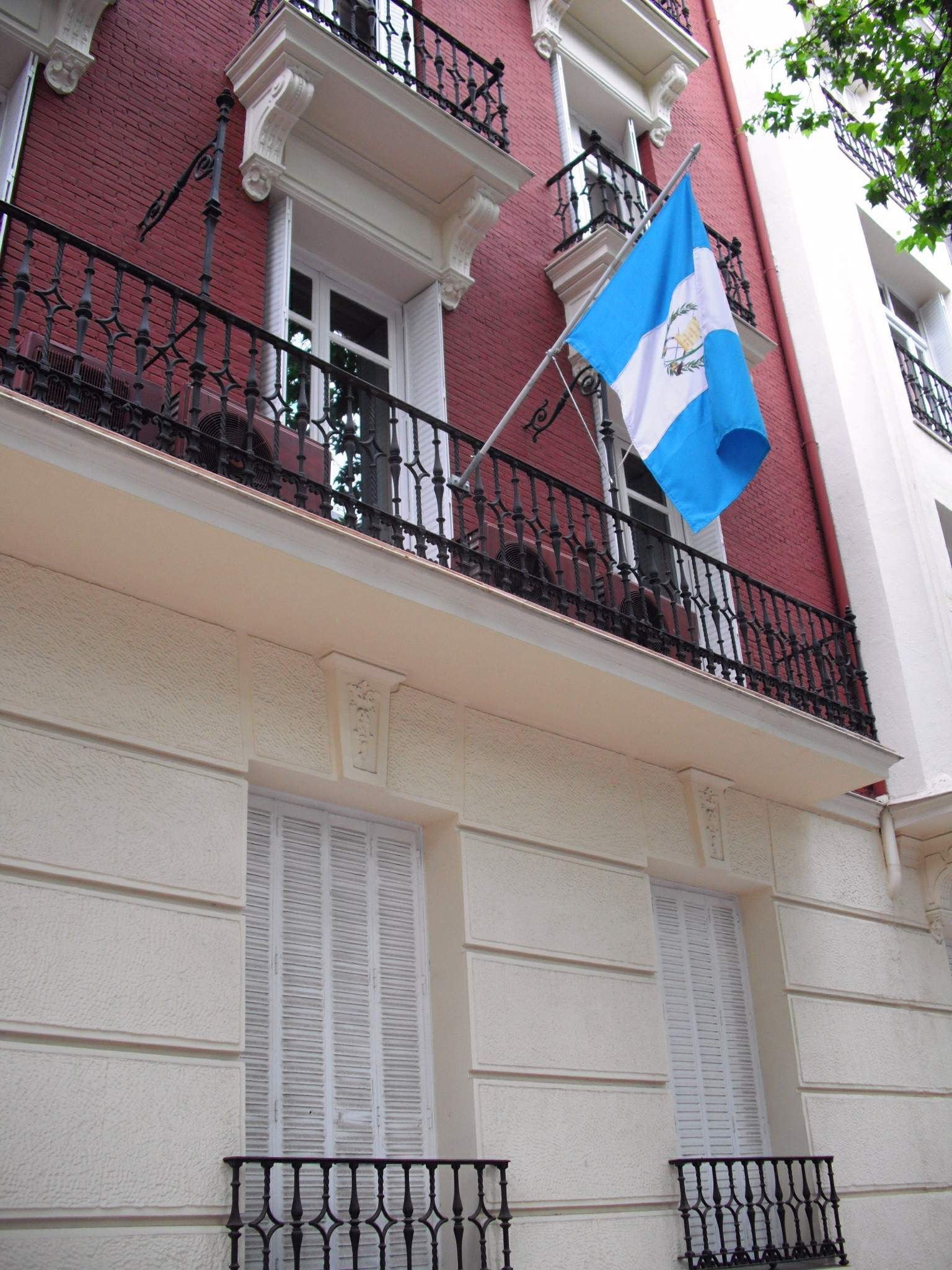
Embassy in Madrid

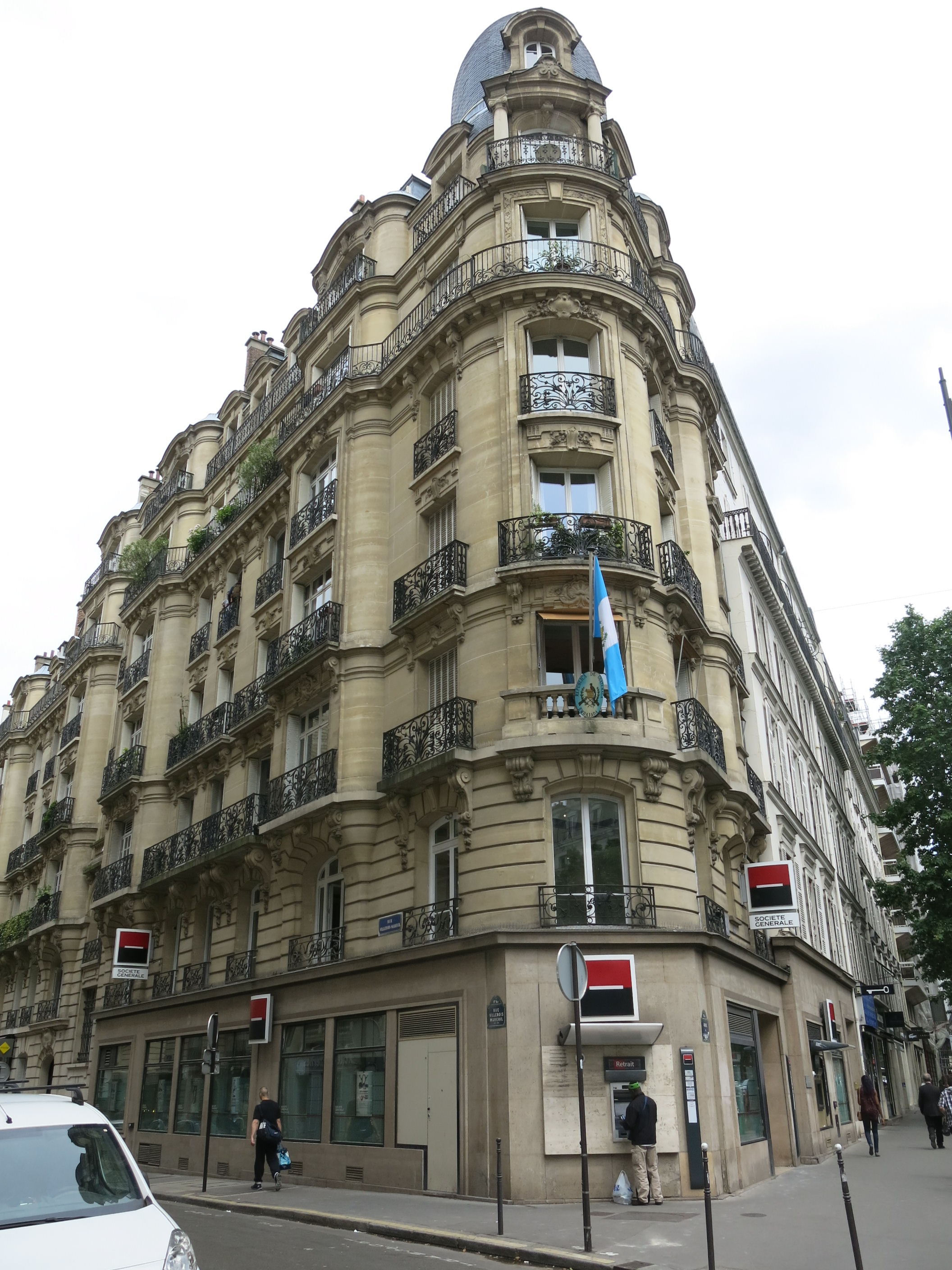
Embassy in Paris

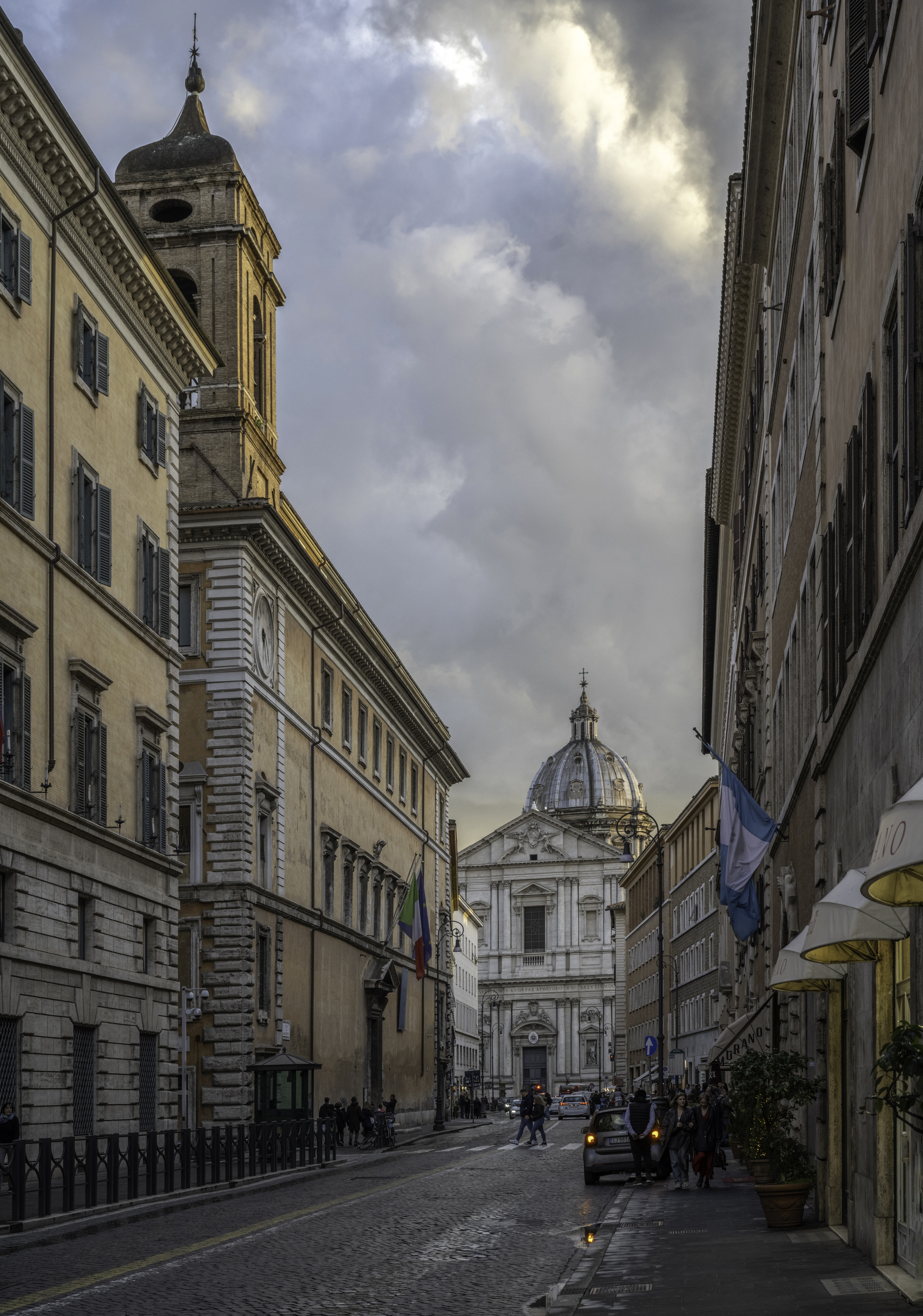
Embassy to the Holy See in Rome

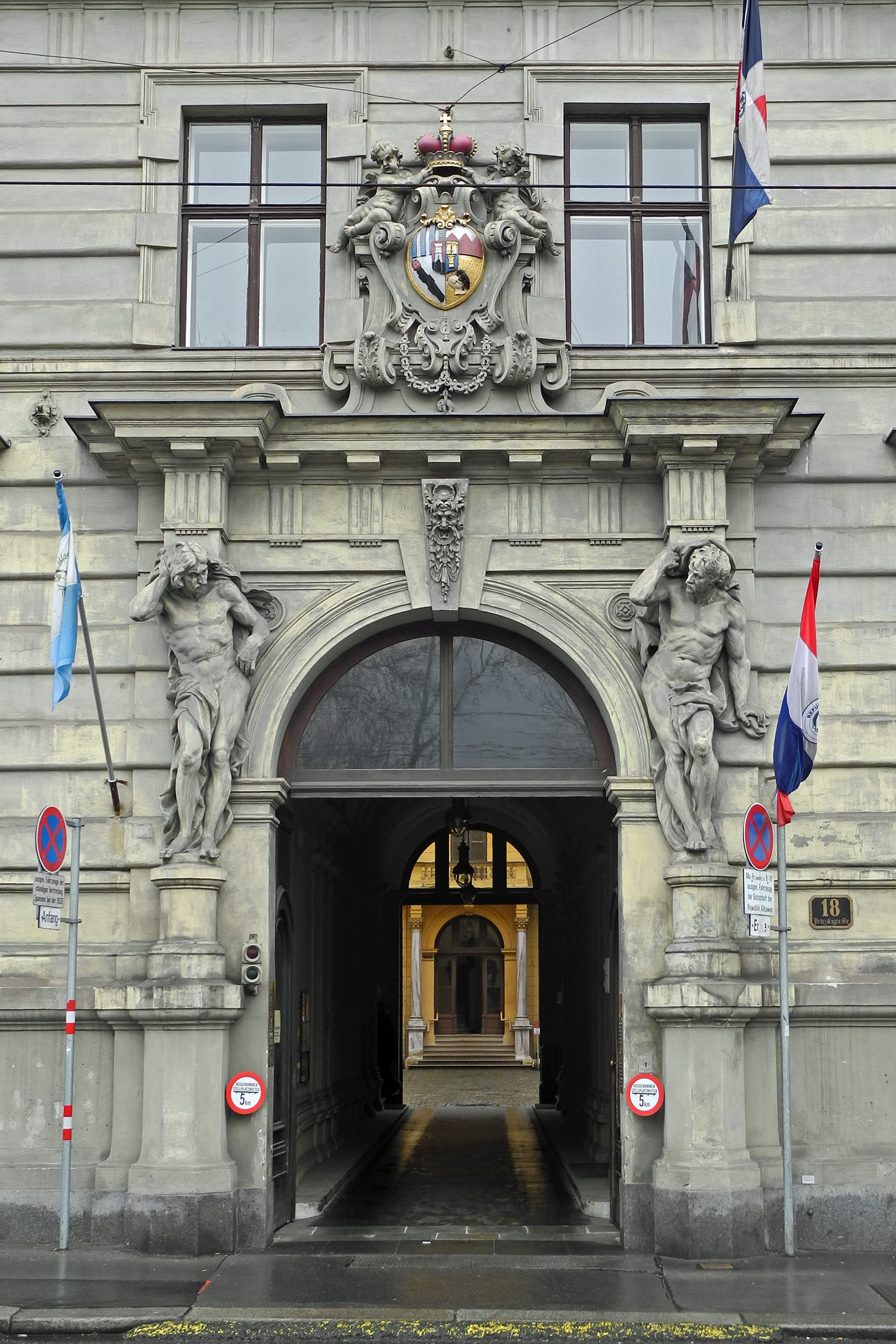
Embassy in Vienna

=== Oceania ===
Host country	Host city	Mission	Concurrent accreditation	Ref.
Australia	Canberra	Embassy	Countries: New Zealand	

=== Multilateral organizations ===
Organization	Host city	Host country	Mission	Concurrent accreditation	Ref.
Organization of American States	Washington, D.C.	United States	Permanent Mission		
United Nations	New York City	United States	Permanent Mission		
United Nations	Geneva	Switzerland	Permanent Mission		
World Trade Organization	Geneva	Switzerland	Permanent Mission	Multilateral Organizations: United Nations Conference on Trade and Development; World Intellectual Property Organization	

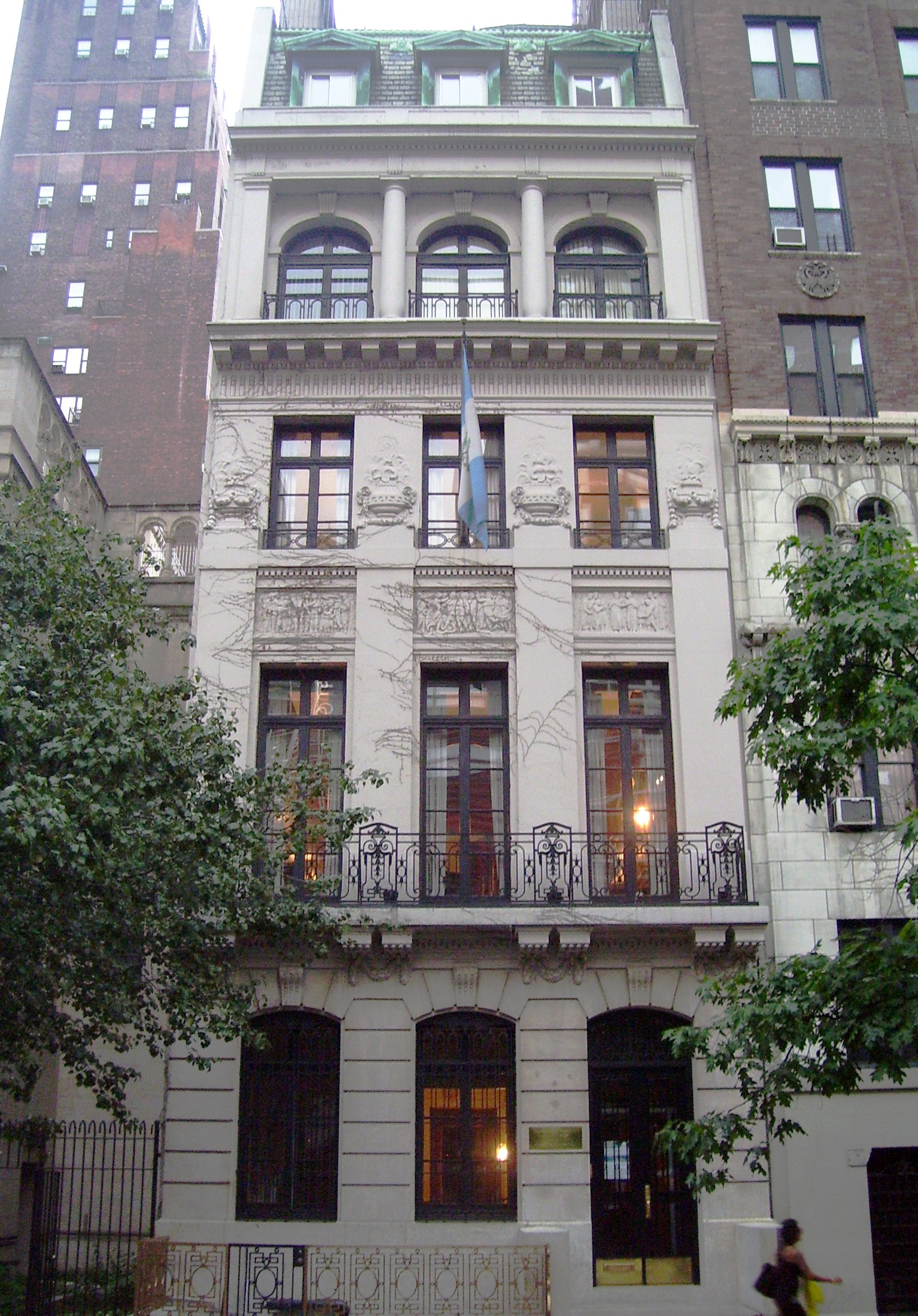
Permanent Mission to the United Nations in New York City

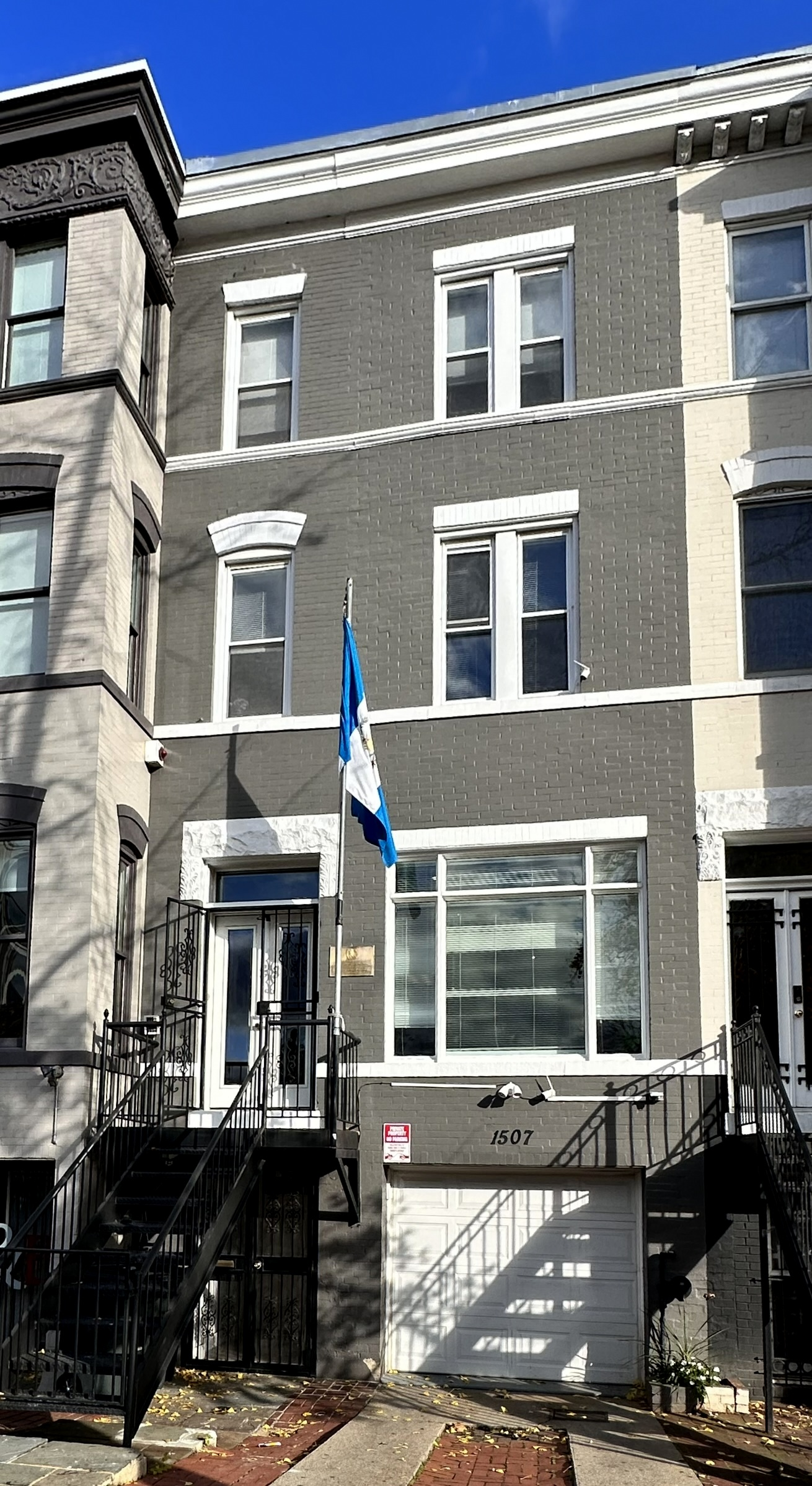
Permanent Mission to the Organization of American States in Washington, D.C.

== Closed missions ==
=== Americas ===
Host country	Host city	Mission	Year closed	Ref.
Mexico	Mérida	Consulate-General	2023	
Paraguay	Asunción	Embassy	2020	
Venezuela	Caracas	Embassy	2020	

=== Asia ===
Host country	Host city	Mission	Year closed	Ref.
(Taiwan) China	Shanghai	Consulate-General (Note: Continues as an embassy in Taipei.)	1937	

=== Europe ===
Host country	Host city	Mission	Year closed	Ref.
Norway	Oslo	Embassy	2016	
Switzerland	Bern	Embassy	Unknown	

== See also ==
- Foreign relations of Guatemala
- Visa policy of Guatemala
- Visa requirements for Guatemalan citizens
