= Passport-free zone =

Passport-free zones may refer to:

- Common Travel Area
- Schengen Area (incl. Nordic Passport Union)
- Central America-4 Border Control Agreement
