= Visa requirements for Guatemalan citizens =

Administrative entry restrictions

Visa requirements for Guatemalan citizens are administrative entry restrictions by the authorities of other states placed on citizens of Guatemala. As of 2026, Guatemalan citizens have visa-free or visa on arrival access to 132 countries and territories, ranking the Guatemalan passport 32nd in terms of travel freedom according to the Henley Passport Index.

== Visa requirements map ==
Guatemala Visa-free eVisa Visa available both on arrival or online Visa on arrival Visa required

== Visa requirements ==
Visa requirements for holders of ordinary passports, and are traveling for tourist purposes:

Country	Visa requirement	Allowed stay	Notes (excluding departure fees)
Afghanistan	eVisa	30 days	Visa is not required in case born in Afghanistan or can proof that one of their parents is a national of Afghanistan or born in Afghanistan.; e-Visa : Visitors must arrive at Kabul International (KBL).
Albania	Visa not required	90 days	
Algeria	Visa required		
Andorra	Visa not required		
Angola	eVisa		
Antigua and Barbuda	eVisa		
Argentina	Visa not required	3 months	
Armenia	eVisa / Visa on arrival	120 days	
Australia	Visa required		May apply online (Online Visitor e600 visa).
Austria	Visa not required	90 days	90 days within any 180 day period in the Schengen Area
Azerbaijan	eVisa	30 days	
Bahamas	Visa not required	3 months	
Bahrain	eVisa / Visa on arrival	14 days	
Bangladesh	Visa on arrival	30 days	
Barbados	Visa not required	90 days	
Belarus	Visa required		Visas are issued on arrival at the Minsk International Airport if the support documents were submitted not later than 3 business days before expected date of arrival.
Belgium	Visa not required	90 days	90 days within any 180 day period in the Schengen Area
Belize	Visa not required	90 days	
Benin	eVisa	30 days	Must have an international vaccination certificate.
Bhutan	eVisa		Visa fee is USD 40 per person and visa application may be processed within 5 business days with duration of stay of 90 days.; e-Visa applicant is also subject to pay Sustainable Development Fee
Bolivia	Visa on arrival	90 days	
Bosnia and Herzegovina	Visa not required	90 days	90 days within any 6-month period
Botswana	Visa required		
Brazil	Visa not required	90 days	
Brunei	Visa required		
Bulgaria	Visa not required	90 days	90 days within any 180 day period
Burkina Faso	eVisa		
Burundi	Visa on arrival		
Cambodia	eVisa / Visa on arrival	30 days	Visa is also obtainable online.
Cameroon	Visa required		
Canada	Visa required		
Cape Verde	Visa on arrival		Not available at all entry points.
Central African Republic	Visa required		
Chad	Visa required		
Chile	Visa not required	90 days	
China	Visa required		
Colombia	Visa not required	180 days	90 days - extendable up to 180-days stay within a one-year period
Comoros	Visa on arrival		
Republic of the Congo	Visa required		
Democratic Republic of the Congo	Visa required		
Costa Rica	Visa not required	90 days	
Côte d'Ivoire	eVisa		
Croatia	Visa not required	90 days	90 days within any 180 day period in the Schengen Area
Cuba	Tourist Card required		
Cyprus	Visa not required	90 days	90 days within any 180 day period
Czech Republic	Visa not required	90 days	90 days within any 180 day period in the Schengen Area
Denmark	Visa not required	90 days	90 days within any 180 day period in the Schengen Area
Djibouti	eVisa	31 days	
Dominica	Visa not required	6 months	
Dominican Republic	Visa not required	90 days	
Ecuador	Visa not required	90 days	
Egypt	Visa required		
El Salvador	Visa not required	6 months	ID Card Valid
Equatorial Guinea	Visa required		must arrive via Malabo International Airport
Eritrea	Visa required		
Estonia	Visa not required	90 days	90 days within any 180 day period in the Schengen Area
Eswatini	Visa required		
Ethiopia	eVisa	up to 90 days	eVisa holders must arrive via Addis Ababa Bole International Airport
Fiji	Visa required		
Finland	Visa not required	90 days	90 days within any 180 day period in the Schengen Area
France and territories	Visa not required	90 days	90 days within any 180 day period in the Schengen Area
Gabon	eVisa		Electronic visa holders must arrive via Libreville International Airport.
Gambia	Visa required		
Georgia	eVisa	90 days	90 days per 180 days period
Germany	Visa not required	90 days	90 days within any 180 day period in the Schengen Area
Ghana	Visa required		
Greece	Visa not required	90 days	90 days within any 180 day period in the Schengen Area
Grenada	Visa required		
Guinea	Visa required		
Guinea-Bissau	Visa on arrival		
Guyana	Visa required		Exempt from obtaining a visa for stays of up to 90 days if they hold a valid visa issued by Canada, the United States or a Schengen member state
Haiti	Visa not required	3 months	
Honduras	Visa not required	90 days	ID Card Valid
Hungary	Visa not required	90 days	90 days within any 180 day period in the Schengen Area
Iceland	Visa not required	90 days	90 days within any 180 day period in the Schengen Area
India	e-Visa	60 days	e-Visa holders must arrive via 32 designated airports (Note: Ahmedabad; Amritsar; Bagdogra; Bengaluru; Bhubaneswar; Chandigarh; Chennai; Coimbatore; Delhi; Gaya; Goa-Dabolim; Goa-Manohar; Guwahati; Hyderabad; Indore; Jaipur; Kannur; Kochi; Kolkata; Kozhikode; Lucknow; Madurai; Mangaluru; Mumbai; Nagpur; Port Blair; Pune; Surat; Thiruvananthapuram; Tiruchirappalli; Varanasi; Visakhapatnam) or 5 designated seaports. (Note: Chennai; Cochin; Mormugao (Goa); Mumbai; Mangalore); An Indian e-Tourist Visa may only be obtained twice within 1 calendar year.; Foreigners of Pakistani origin or who hold a Pakistani Passport are not eligible for an e-Visa. Foreigners who are not Pakistani nationals, but whose parents or grandparents (either paternal or maternal) were born in, or were permanent residents in Pakistan, are also not eligible for an e-Visa.
Indonesia	Visa on arrival	30 days	
Iran	Visa on arrival	30 days	
Iraq	Visa required		
Ireland	Visa not required	3 months	
Israel	Electronic Travel Authorization	90 days	
Italy	Visa not required	90 days	90 days within any 180 day period in the Schengen Area
Jamaica	Visa not required	30 days	
Japan	Visa not required	90 days	
Jordan	Visa on arrival	30 days	Conditions apply.; Not available at all entry points.
Kazakhstan	eVisa		Must arrive via Nursultan Nazarbayev International Airport or Almaty International Airport
Kenya	eVisa	3 months	
Kiribati	Visa not required	90 days	May not exceed 90 days within any 12-month period
North Korea	Visa required		
South Korea	Korean Electronic Travel Authorization	90 days	
Kuwait	Visa required		
Kyrgyzstan	eVisa		Electronic visa holders must arrive via Manas International Airport or Osh Airport or through land crossings with China (at Irkeshtam and Torugart), Kazakhstan (at Ak-jol, Ak-Tilek, Chaldybar, Chon-Kapka), Tajikistan (at Bor-Dobo, Kulundu, Kyzyl-Bel) and Uzbekistan (at Dostuk).
Laos	eVisa / Visa on arrival	30 days	18 (Note: Savannakhet Airport; Lanetoui - Mengkang (China); Meuangmom - Wan Pong (Myanmar); Banvang - Ban Khok Phai (Thailand); Namngeun - Huay Kon (Thailand); Paksan - Bueng Kan (Thailand); Paktaphan - Pak Saeng (Thailand); Pangmon - Ban Huak (Thailand); Phoudou (Thailand); Dak ta ock - Nam Giang (Vietnam); La Lai (Vietnam); Namkan (Vietnam); Namphao - Cau Treo (Vietnam); Namsoy - Na Meo (Vietnam); Naphao - Cha Lo (Vietnam); Pahang - Long Sap (Vietnam); Panghok - Tây Trang (Vietnam); Phoukeua - Bo Y (Vietnam)) of the 33 border crossings are only open to regular visa holders.; e-Visa may be used to enter Laos through the Luang Prabang, Pakse and Vientiane international airports, 3 Thai-Lao Friendship Bridges (Note: Vientiane (Friendship Bridge 1); Savannakhet (Friendship Bridge 2); Bokeo (Friendship Bridge 4)), in Boten (road and railroad), and in Vientiane (at Khamsavath railway station).; Visa on arrival is available at the Luang Prabang, Pakse and Vientiane international airports, 4 Thai-Lao Friendship Bridges (Note: Vientiane (Friendship Bridge 1); Savannakhet (Friendship Bridge 2); Khammouane (Friendship Bridge 3); Bokeo (Friendship Bridge 4)) and 7 border crossings. (Note: Nongnokkheane - Trapeang Kriel (Cambodia); Boten - Bo han (China); Golden Triangle/Samliemkham (Thailand); Khamsavath railway station (Thailand); Namheuang - Ban Na Kraseng (Thailand); Vang tao - Chongmek (Thailand); Dansavan - Lao Bảo (Vietnam))
Latvia	Visa not required	90 days	90 days within any 180 day period in the Schengen Area
Lebanon	Visa required		
Lesotho	eVisa		
Liberia	Visa required		
Libya	Visa required		
Liechtenstein	Visa not required	90 days	90 days within any 180 day period in the Schengen Area
Lithuania	Visa not required	90 days	90 days within any 180 day period in the Schengen Area
Luxembourg	Visa not required	90 days	90 days within any 180 day period in the Schengen Area
Madagascar	eVisa / Visa on arrival	90 days	
Malawi	Visa on arrival		
Malaysia	Visa not required	30 days	
Maldives	Free visa on arrival	30 days	Extension possible
Mali	Visa required		
Malta	Visa not required	90 days	90 days within any 180 day period in the Schengen Area
Marshall Islands	Visa on arrival	90 days	
Mauritania	Visa on arrival		Available at Nouakchott–Oumtounsy International Airport.
Mauritius	Visa not required	90 days	
Mexico	Visa required		Visa not required for holders of valid visa or permanent residence issued by the U.S., Canada, Japan, United Kingdom, Colombia, Chile, or Schengen area.; 7 days with Tarjeta de Visitante Regional (TVR) issued at Official Border Crossings, allows entry into the four Southern States.
Micronesia	Visa not required	30 days	
Moldova	Visa not required	90 days	90 days within any 180 day period
Monaco	Visa not required		
Mongolia	eVisa		
Montenegro	Visa not required	90 days	
Morocco	eVisa		
Mozambique	Visa on arrival	30 days	Conditions apply
Myanmar	eVisa	28 days	eVisa holders must arrive via Yangon, Nay Pyi Taw or Mandalay airports or via land border crossings with Thailand — Tachileik, Myawaddy and Kawthaung or India — Rih Khaw Dar and Tamu.; eVisa is available for tourism only.
Namibia	Visa required		
Nauru	Visa required		
Nepal	Visa on arrival	90 days	
Netherlands	Visa not required	90 days	90 days within any 180 day period in the Schengen Area
New Zealand	Visa required		Holders of an Australian Permanent Resident Visa or Resident Return Visa may be granted a New Zealand Resident Visa on arrival permitting indefinite stay (pursuant to the Trans-Tasman Travel Arrangement), subject to meeting character requirements and obtaining an Electronic Travel Authority prior to departure.
Nicaragua	Visa not required	3 months	ID Card Valid
Niger	Visa required		
Nigeria	Visa required		
North Macedonia	Visa not required	90 days	
Norway	Visa not required	90 days	90 days within any 180 day period in the Schengen Area
Oman	Visa required		
Pakistan	Online Visa		Online Visa eligible.; Electronic Travel Authorization to obtain a visa on arrival for business purposes.
Palau	Free visa on arrival	30 days	
Panama	Visa not required	180 days	
Papua New Guinea	Visa required		
Paraguay	Visa not required	90 days	
Peru	Visa not required	90 days	
Philippines	Visa not required	30 days	
Poland	Visa not required	90 days	90 days within any 180 day period in the Schengen Area
Portugal	Visa not required	90 days	90 days within any 180 day period in the Schengen Area
Qatar	eVisa		
Romania	Visa not required	90 days	90 days within any 180 day period
Russia	Visa not required	90 days	90 days within any 180 day period
Rwanda	eVisa / Visa on arrival	30 days	
Saint Kitts and Nevis	Visa not required	3 months	
Saint Lucia	Visa on arrival	6 weeks	
Saint Vincent and the Grenadines	Visa not required	3 months	
Samoa	Free Entry Permit on arrival	60 days	
San Marino	Visa not required		
São Tomé and Príncipe	eVisa		
Saudi Arabia	Visa required		
Senegal	Visa on arrival	90 days	
Serbia	Visa required		May enter if holding a USA Green Card
Seychelles	Seychelles Electronic Border System	3 months	Extendable up to a year with fee
Sierra Leone	Visa required		
Singapore	Visa not required	30 days	
Slovakia	Visa not required	90 days	90 days within any 180 day period in the Schengen Area
Slovenia	Visa not required	90 days	90 days within any 180 day period in the Schengen Area
Solomon Islands	Visa required		
Somalia	Visa on arrival	30 days	All visitors must have an approved Electronic Visa (eTAS) before the start of their journey.
South Africa	Visa required		
South Sudan	Electronic Visa		Obtainable online; Printed visa authorization must be presented at the time of travel
Spain	Visa not required	90 days	90 days within any 180 day period in the Schengen Area
Sri Lanka	eVisa / Visa on arrival	30 days	
Sudan	Visa required		
Suriname	Visa not required	90 days	
Sweden	Visa not required	90 days	90 days within any 180 day period in the Schengen Area
Switzerland	Visa not required	90 days	90 days within any 180 day period in the Schengen Area
Syria	Visa required		
Tajikistan	eVisa	30 days or 60 days	
Tanzania	eVisa / Visa on arrival	3 months	
Thailand	Visa not required	60 days	
Timor-Leste	Visa on arrival	30 days	Not available at all entry points.
Togo	Visa on arrival	7 days	
Tonga	Visa required		
Trinidad and Tobago	Visa not required	90 days	
Tunisia	Visa required		
Turkey	Visa not required	3 months	
Turkmenistan	Visa required		
Tuvalu	Visa on arrival	1 month	
Uganda	eVisa / Visa on arrival		Determined at the port of entry. May apply online.
Ukraine	Visa required		e-Visa is currently suspended due to Russian invasion of Ukraine.
United Arab Emirates	Visa required		
United Kingdom	Electronic Travel Authorisation	6 months	
United States	Visa required		
Uruguay	Visa not required	90 days	
Uzbekistan	Visa not required	30 days	
Vanuatu	Visa required		
Vatican City	Visa not required		
Venezuela	Visa required		
Vietnam	eVisa		Phú Quốc 30 day visa exemption
Yemen	Visa required		
Zambia	Visa not required	90 days	
Zimbabwe	eVisa / Visa on arrival	30 days	Can be extended up to 90 days

=== Territories or administrative subdivisions with different visa policies ===
Visa requirements for Guatemalan citizens for visits to various territories, disputed areas, partially recognized countries not mentioned in the list above, recognized administrative subdivisions that operate on different visa policies and restricted zones:

Visitor to	Visa requirement	Allowed stay	Notes (excluding departure fees)
Africa
Eritrea outside Asmara	Travel permit required		Travel Permit for Foreigners is required to travel outside of the capital.
Ascension Island	eVisa	3 months	3 months within any one year period
Saint Helena	Visa Free with Payment		Visitor's Pass granted on arrival.
Tristan da Cunha	Permission required		Permission to land required for 15/30 pounds sterling (yacht/ship passenger) for Tristan da Cunha Island; 20 pounds sterling for Gough Island, Inaccessible Island or Nightingale Islands.
Mayotte	Visa not required	90 days	
Sahrawi Arab Democratic Republic	Undefined		Undefined visa regime in the Western Sahara, same entry requirements with Morocco, controlled territory.
Somaliland	Visa on arrival	30 days	Obtainable on arrival or at the Somaliland Mission in Alexandria, VA.
Réunion	Visa not required	90 days	
Sudan outside Khartoum	Travel permit required		All foreigners traveling more than 25 km (16 mi) outside of Khartoum must obtain a travel permit.
(Sudan) Darfur	Travel permit required		Separate travel permit is required.
Asia
British Indian Ocean Territory	Special permit required		Special permit required.
(China) Hainan	Visa required		
Hong Kong	Visa not required	30 days	
Protected and restricted areas of India	PAP/RAP required		Protected Area Permit (PAP) required for whole states of Nagaland and Sikkim and parts of states Manipur, Arunachal Pradesh, Uttarakhand, Jammu and Kashmir, Rajasthan, Himachal Pradesh.; Restricted Area Permit (RAP) required for all of Andaman and Nicobar Islands and parts of Sikkim.; Some of these requirements are occasionally lifted for a year.
Iraqi Kurdistan	eVisa		
(Kazakhstan) Baikonur & Priozersk	Special permission required		Special permission required for the city of Baikonur and surrounding areas in Kyzylorda Oblast, and the town of Priozersk near Almaty.
(Iran) Kish Island	Visa not required		Tourists for Kish Island do not require a visa.
Macao	Visa on arrival	30 days	
(Malaysia) Sabah and Sarawak	Visa not required		These states have their own immigration authorities and passport is required to travel to them, however the same visa applies.
Maldives outside Malé	Permission required		Tourists are generally prohibited from visiting non-resort islands without the express permission of the Government of the Maldives.
Palestine	Visa not required		Travel to Gaza Strip may be restricted.
Taiwan	Visa not required	90 days	
(Tajikistan) Gorno-Badakhshan Autonomous Province	OIVR permit required		OIVR permit required; Special permit required for Lake Sarez.
(China) Tibet Autonomous Region	TTP required		Tibet Travel Permit required in addision to Chinese visa.
Closed cities of Turkmenistan	Special permit required		A special permit, issued prior to arrival by Ministry of Foreign Affairs, is required if visiting the following places: Atamurat, Cheleken, Dashoguz, Serakhs and Serhetabat.
(Vietnam) Phú Quốc	Visa not required	30 days	
Yemen outside Sanaa or Aden	Special permission required		Special permission needed for travel outside Sanaa or Aden.
Caribbean and North Atlantic
Anguilla	Visa not required	3 months	
Aruba	Visa not required	90 days	
Bermuda	Visa not required	6 months	
(Caribbean Netherlands) (Bonaire, St. Eustatius and Saba)	Visa not required	90 days	
British Virgin Islands	Visa not required	30 days	
Cayman Islands	Visa required		
(Colombia) San Andrés and Leticia	Tourist Card on arrival		Visitors arriving at Gustavo Rojas Pinilla International Airport and Alfredo Vásquez Cobo International Airport must buy tourist cards on arrival.
Curaçao	Visa not required	3 months	Maximum consecutive period of three months every six months.
(France) French West Indies (Martinique, Guadeloupe, Saint Martin and Saint Barthélemy)	Visa not required	3 months	
Greenland	Visa not required		
Montserrat	Visa not required	6 months	
Sint Maarten	Visa not required	3 months	Maximum stay allowed is 3 months uninterrupted with the possibility to extend
Turks and Caicos Islands	Visa required		
Europe
Abkhazia	Visa required		
(Belarus) Brest and Grodno	Visa not required	10 days	
Turkish Republic of Northern Cyprus	Visa not required	3 months	
Faroe Islands	Visa not required		
Gibraltar	Visa not required		
Guernsey	Visa not required	6 months	
Isle of Man	Visa not required	6 months	
(Norway) Jan Mayen	Permit required	24 hours	Permit issued by the local police required for stays less than 24 hours; Permit issued by the Norwegian police required for stays of more than 24 hours.
Jersey	Visa not required	6 months	
Closed cities of Russia	Special authorization required		Several closed cities and regions in Russia require special authorization.
South Ossetia	Visa required		Multiple entry visa to Russia and three-day prior notification are required to enter South Ossetia.
Svalbard	Visa not required	Unlimited	Any of any nationality may live and work freely in Svalbard per the Svalbard Treaty.
Transnistria	Visa not required	24 hours	Registration required after 24 h.
Oceania
American Samoa	Visa required		
(Australia) Ashmore and Cartier Islands	Special authorisation required		Special authorisation required.
(France) Clipperton Island	Special permit required		Special permit required.
Cook Islands	Visa not required	31 days	
(Fiji) Lau Province	Special permission required		Special permission required.
French Polynesia	Visa not required	90 days	90 days within any 180-day period
Guam	Visa required		
Niue	Visa not required	30 days	
Northern Mariana Islands	Visa required		
Pitcairn Islands	Visa not required	14 days	
Tokelau	Entry permit required		
South America
Galápagos	Pre-registration required		Online pre-registration is required.; Transit Control Card must be obtained at the airport prior to departure.
(France) French Guiana	Visa not required	3 months	International Certificate of Vaccination required.
South Atlantic and Antarctica
Falkland Islands	Visa not required		
South Georgia and the South Sandwich Islands	Permit required		Pre-arrival permit from the Commissioner required (72 hours/1 month for 110/160 pounds sterling).
Antarctica	Special permits required		Special permits required for Bouvet Island, British Antarctic Territory, French Southern and Antarctic Lands, Argentine Antarctica, (Australia) Australian Antarctic Territory, (Antártica Chilena Province) Chilean Antarctic Territory, (Australia) Heard Island and McDonald Islands, (Norway) Peter I Island, (Norway) Queen Maud Land, (New Zealand) Ross Dependency.

== See also ==
- Visa policy of Guatemala
- Guatemalan passport
