= Visa policy of Nicaragua =

Policy on permits required to enter Nicaragua

Visitors to Nicaragua must obtain an e-Visa unless they are citizens of one of the visa-exempt countries.

All visitors must hold a passport valid for at least 6 months from the date of arrival.

== Visa policy map ==
Visa policy of Nicaragua Nicaragua Visa not required - may enter with an ID card (90 days) Visa not required (90 days) Visa not required (30 days) eVisa

== Visa exemption ==
Citizens of the following countries and territories may enter Nicaragua without a visa for stays up to the duration listed below. All visitors must hold proof of sufficient funds to cover their stay and documents required for next destination. The stay may be extended for a fee of USD 2 per additional day.

90 days

- All European Union member states

- Abkhazia
- Albania
- Algeria
- Angola
- Argentina
- Australia
- Bahrain
- Belize
- Bolivia
- Brazil
- Brunei
- Canada
- Chile
- Costa Rica
- Dominica
- Dominican Republic
- Ecuador
- El Salvador^{ID}
- Guatemala^{ID}
- Honduras^{ID}
- Israel
- Japan
- Kuwait
- Malaysia
- Moldova
- Norway
- Palestine
- Panama
- Paraguay
- Philippines
- Qatar
- Saudi Arabia
- Singapore
- Solomon Islands
- South Africa
- South Korea
- South Ossetia
- Switzerland
- Turkey
- United Kingdom
- United States
- Uruguay
- Vatican City

90 days within any 180 days

- Russia

90 days within a calendar year

- Belarus

30 days

- Hong Kong

30 days within any 180 days

- Kazakhstan

_{ID - May enter with an ID card if come from a country that is part of the CA-4 Agreement.}

Date of visa changes
- 1 May 1987: Finland
- 19 March 2009: Russia (resumed)
- 1 April 2009: Ukraine
- 31 October 2018: Venezuela (resumed)
- 26 November 2021: Cuba
- 26 July 2023: Kazakhstan
- 16 February 2026: Algeria, Angola, Bolivia, Dominica, Dominican Republic, Moldova, Philippines
- October 2026: Croatia, Estonia, Lithuania, Slovakia, Slovenia (all resumed)

Cancelled:

- 2005: Russia
- 17 November 2017: Iran
- 11 January 2021: Venezuela
- 16 February 2026: Andorra, Antigua and Barbuda, Bahamas, Barbados, Croatia, Cuba, Estonia, Fiji, Iceland, Liechtenstein, Lithuania, Macau, Madagascar, Marshall Islands, Mexico, Monaco, New Zealand, Saint Kitts and Nevis, Saint Lucia, Saint Vincent and the Grenadines, San Marino, São Tomé and Príncipe, Slovakia, Slovenia, Taiwan, Trinidad and Tobago, Tuvalu, Ukraine, United Arab Emirates, Vanuatu

== Electronic visa (e-Visa) ==
Citizens of other countries are eligible to obtain an e-Visa.

The country launched the electronic visa portal in March 2026.

== Transit ==
Transit without a visa is generally allowed for travelers who normally require a visa but are transiting within 24 hours and hold onward tickets.

Citizens of Afghanistan, Albania, Armenia, Bangladesh, Bosnia and Herzegovina, Botswana, Cameroon, China, Republic of the Congo, Democratic Republic of the Congo, Cuba, Eritrea, Haiti, India, Iraq, Kenya, Laos, Lebanon, Liberia, Mali, Mongolia, Nepal, Nigeria, Pakistan, Sierra Leone, Somalia, Sri Lanka, Sudan, Syria, Timor-Leste, Vietnam and Yemen are required to obtain a transit visa.

== Tourist card ==
Citizens from all visa-exempt countries are required to obtain a tourist card (US$10) on arrival. Exempt are the citizens of El Salvador, Guatemala, and Honduras, as well as holders of diplomatic, official, service or special passports issued to any country.

== Central America-4 Border Control Agreement ==
The Central America-4 Border Control Agreement is a treaty between Guatemala, El Salvador, Honduras and Nicaragua. A visa issued by one of the four countries is honored by all four of the countries.
The time period for the visa, however, applies to the total time spent in any of the four countries without leaving the CA-4 area.

== Visitor statistics ==
Most visitors arriving in Nicaragua were from the following countries of nationality:

Country	2015	2014	2013
Honduras	276,767	263,927	273,015
United States	275,406	267,320	243,039
Costa Rica	167,448	146,071	163,758
El Salvador	155,701	143,303	150,963
Guatemala	90,296	85,283	94,957
Canada	35,260	39,370	33,832
Panama	22,223	24,553	24,676
Mexico	19,030	15,666	14,947
Germany	17,392	16,155	13,936
United Kingdom	14,737	15,596	10,604
Total	1,386,481	1,329,663	1,229,410

== See also ==
- Central America-4 Border Control Agreement
- Visa requirements for Nicaraguan citizens
