= Central America-4 Border Control Agreement =

Boundary treaty in Central America

CA-4 travel regime

A clickable Euler diagram showing the relationships between various multinational organizations in the Americasv • d • e

The Central America-4 Free Mobility Agreement (CA-4; Spanish: Convenio Centroamericano de libre movilidad) is a treaty signed in June 2006 between the Central American nations of El Salvador, Guatemala, Honduras, and Nicaragua, establishing the free movement across borders between the four signatory states of their citizens without any restrictions or checks. Foreign nationals who enter one of the signatory countries can also travel to other signatory states by land (but not by air) without having to obtain additional permits or to undergo checks at border checkpoints. Similar to the Schengen Agreement in Europe, the CA-4 Agreement establishes a harmonized visa regime for nationals travelling to the area.

== See also ==
- Central America-4 passport
- Visa policy of El Salvador
- Visa policy of Guatemala
- Visa policy of Honduras
- Visa policy of Nicaragua
- Northern Triangle of Central America
