= Guatemalan nationality law =

Guatemalan nationality law is regulated by the 1985 Constitution, as amended in 1995, and the 1966 Nationality Law, as amended in 1996. These laws determine who is, or is eligible to be, a citizen of Guatemala. The legal means to acquire nationality and formal membership in a nation differ from the relationship of rights and obligations between a national and the nation, known as citizenship. Guatemalan nationality is typically obtained either on the principle of jus soli, i.e. by birth in Guatemala; or under the rules of jus sanguinis, i.e. by birth abroad to at least one parent with Guatemalan nationality. It can also be granted to a permanent resident who has lived in Guatemala for a given period of time through naturalization.

== Acquiring Guatemalan nationality ==
Guatemalans may acquire nationality through birth or naturalization. If a Guatemalan national has lost nationality through mandatory regulation of a foreign government, such as a requirement for a woman to lose her nationality upon marriage to a foreigner, it may be re-acquired by establishing a domicile in the country and requesting repatriation according to the proper procedures.

=== By birthright ===
- Those born within the territory of Guatemala, on Guatemalan ships, or in Guatemalan aircraft.
- Those born abroad to Guatemalan parents.
- Those citizens of other Central American countries, which were part of the former Federal Republic of Central America, who have establish a domicile in Guatemala and request naturalization from the authorities. Article 19 of Title VIII, extends this provision to Belizean citizens.

=== By naturalization ===
Naturalization (known as 'naturalizacion concesiva') requires completion of an application of request filed with the departmental governor. The application must be supported with the requisite documents to establish eligibility and confirm Spanish language proficiency. Upon verification that documentation meets the legal requirements it must be approved by the Ministry of Foreign Affairs and the Public Ministry prior to presentation to the President of Guatemala. The president determines whether nationality is granted.

Naturalization may be granted to applicants who satisfy one of the following requirements:

- Foreigners who have established a domicile in Guatemala for 5 consecutive years immediately prior to the application. During this period of 5 years, there must not have been any single absence exceeding 6 consecutive months or absences totalling 1 year or more.
- Foreigners who have established a domicile in Guatemala for 10 years.
- Foreigners in one of the following categories who have established a domicile in Guatemala for 2 consecutive years immediately prior to the application. During this period of 2 years, there must not have been any single absence exceeding 1 consecutive month or absences totalling 2 months or more.
  - Foreigners who have rendered important services to Guatemala or have contributed to its economic, social or cultural development.
  - Foreigners who resided in another Central American country for at least 3 years before residing in Guatemala.
  - Foreigners of recognised scientific, artistic or philanthropic merit.
  - Stateless persons

== Loss of Guatemalan nationality ==
- Guatemalans cannot renounce their nationality unless it is a requirement to attaining another nationality.
- Naturalized Guatemalans who are found to have used false documents to acquire nationality can have their right revoked.
- In cases where a naturalized Guatemalan participates in activities that pose a security risk to the state, wherein another state might invoke foreign sovereignty over Guatemala, or if the citizen refuses to uphold the duty to defend the country and other obligations of citizenship, nationality can be lost.
- Nationality can be revoked if a citizen has a serious criminal record which was not disclosed during the naturalization process.
- Defects in the marriage process which allowed naturalization may be cause for loss of nationality.

== Dual nationality ==
- Guatemala has a dual nationality agreement with Spain whereby their nationals of origin can opt for the other's nationality by solely establishing their legal residence in the country and registering this desired change with that country's central civil registry.
- Dual nationality is accepted as long as it does not invoke another sovereignty over that of Guatemala.

== History ==
Guatemala declared independence from Spain on 15 September 1821 in conjunction with the other provinces which had been part of the Captaincy General of Guatemala. After an unsuccessful attempt to become part of the Mexican Empire, in 1823, Guatemala joined the Federal Republic of Central America, which drafted its first constitution in 1824. The federal constitution established that those born in Costa Rica, Guatemala, El Salvador, Honduras, and Nicaragua were nationals and extended citizen rights to those who had been naturalized. Nationals were recognized in Article 3 as all inhabitants, regardless of their ancestry, length of residence, other nationality, or where they were born. The constitution also abolished slavery throughout the territory and allowed foreigners married to nationals of the constituent states to naturalize. The first constitution of the nation was adopted the following year and provided birthright nationality to those born within the federal territory as well as those born abroad to parents who were natives of the federal territory who were serving the government. Naturalization was open to foreigners who provided artistic or scientific services not otherwise available, those who owned property meeting certain criteria, and those who had been living in the territory at independence and supported its independence. It also had provisions for gaining naturalization by marriage, for settling with a family after three years, and for settling in the territory for a minimum of five years.

Faced with the collapse of the Federal Republic, Guatemala created a provisional constitution and the Declaration of the Rights of the State and its Inhabitants (Declaración de los Derechos del Estado y sus Habitantes) in 1839. The constitution defined nationals as those who were either naturalized or born in the territory. It remained in place until development of the Constitutive Act of 1851, which defined as nationals those born in the territory, those who were residing in the territory when it gained independence or were natives of the other states of Central America, those born abroad to Guatemalan parents, and those who had been naturalized. In November of the same year, legislation was passed excluding indigenous people born in the nation. In 1868, when coffee production increased dramatically, a new Law on Foreigners allowed immigrants without criminal records, who were engaged in economic activities or were married to Guatemalans, to naturalize without the customary formalities. In 1877 Guatemala adopted the 1852 Civil Code of Peru, which would remain in force until 1933 in Guatemala. It required that a woman relinquish her nationality upon marriage and take that of her husband. Two years later, in 1879, the nation adopted a new constitution which would remain in force until 1944. It defined nationals as those who were naturalized, those born in the country regardless of the nationality of the child's parents, those from other Central American countries residing in Guatemala, or legitimate children or legally recognized illegitimate child born abroad to a Guatemalan father or illegitimate children born abroad to a Guatemalan mother who were residing in Guatemala or chose Guatemalan nationality upon reaching their majority.

According to the Nationality Law of 1894, a foreign woman who had acquired Guatemalan nationality through marriage could repudiate the nationality at the termination of the marriage by acquiring another nationality. The same law provided that foreigners of either sex could obtain or relinquish nationality independently from their spouses and that naturalization did not change the nationality of their minor children. The Immigration Act of 1909 prohibited Chinese persons, criminals, or people over 60 years old from immigrating to the country. In 1933, the Civil Code was modified to provide in Article 97 that a Guatemala woman who married a foreigner lost her nationality unless she specified in the marriage contract that she wanted to keep her Guatemalan nationality. It also provided that a foreign woman gained Guatemalan nationality upon marriage unless she specified at the time of the marriage that she wanted to retain her original nationality. To repatriate upon termination of the marriage a Guatemalan woman who had lost her nationality had to live in the territory or request it from the authorities if she did not reside in the territory. In 1933, the Guatemalan delegates to the Pan-American Union's Montevideo conference, signed the Inter-American Convention on the Nationality of Women, which became effective in 1934, without legal reservations.

Article 8 of the Immigration Act of 1936 specified that children born to a Guatemalan mother and a foreigner were not nationals nor were those born to parents who had lost their nationality, including by means of political dissent. Article 10 of the Act excluded Asians, blacks, and Roma from immigration, as well as those who had been convicted of a crime or had been expelled from other countries for anarchist or communist beliefs. These provisions of Article 10 were overturned in the 1944 Constitution which in Title III, Chapter 1, Article 21 provided that discrimination based on class, color, race, sex, or political or religious belief was illegal and punishable under the law. The constitution also provided limited voting privileges to women and expanded nationality to include any Spanish or Latin American who was residing in Guatemala who requested Guatemalan nationality in the official manner. In Title I, Article 12 outlawed dual nationality except in the case of naturalization in another Central American country, Spain, or another Latin American country.
