= Visa policy of Guatemala =

Policy on permits required to enter Guatemala

Visitors to Guatemala must obtain a visa from one of the Guatemalan diplomatic missions unless they are citizens from one of the visa-exempt countries.

== Visa policy map ==
Visa policy of Guatemala Guatemala Visa not required (90 days) Visa not required (90 days) if holding a valid Canadian, Mexican, Schengen or US visa, or a permanent residence card issued by the US; otherwise, visa required Visa required

== Visa exemption ==
=== Ordinary passports ===
Citizens of the following countries and territories may enter Guatemala without a visa for up to 90 days. The stay may be extended for an additional 90 days.

- All European Union member states

- Andorra
- Antigua and Barbuda
- Argentina
- Australia
- Bahamas
- Bahrain
- Barbados
- Belize
- Brazil
- Brunei
- Canada
- Chile
- Colombia
- Costa Rica
- El Salvador^{ID}
- Fiji
- Honduras^{ID}
- Iceland
- Israel
- Japan
- Kuwait
- Liechtenstein
- Madagascar
- Malaysia
- Marshall Islands
- Mexico
- Monaco
- New Zealand
- Nicaragua^{ID}
- North Macedonia
- Norway
- Panama
- Paraguay
- Peru
- Qatar
- Russia
- Saint Kitts and Nevis
- Saint Lucia
- Saint Vincent and the Grenadines
- San Marino
- São Tomé and Príncipe
- Saudi Arabia
- Singapore
- Solomon Islands
- South Africa
- South Korea
- Switzerland
- Taiwan
- Trinidad and Tobago
- Turkey
- Tuvalu
- Ukraine
- United Arab Emirates
- United Kingdom
- United States
- Uruguay
- Vanuatu
- Vatican City

_{ID - May also enter with an ID card if coming from a country that is part of the CA-4 Agreement.}

Date of visa changes
- 17 October 1969: Spain
- 1 January 1976: Japan
- 31 March 2009: Ukraine
- 1 April 2009: Russia
- 1 July 2013: Colombia and Peru
- 22 February 2017: Dominican Republic (canceled on 15 February 2023)
- 22 August 2019: Ecuador (canceled on 20 September 2021)

Cancelled:

- 19 March 2018: Venezuela
- 20 September 2021: Ecuador
- 15 February 2023: Dominican Republic

==== Substitute visa ====
Citizens of other countries who would normally require visas may enter Guatemala without a visa for up to 90 days if holding a valid visa issued by any Schengen Area member state, Canada, Mexico or the United States, or a permanent residence card (Green Card) issued by the United States. The stay may be extended for an additional 90 days.

However, this policy does not apply to citizens of the following countries and territories:

- Afghanistan
- Albania
- Algeria
- Angola
- Armenia
- Bangladesh
- Bosnia and Herzegovina
- Botswana
- Cameroon
- China
- Republic of the Congo
- DR Congo
- Cuba
- Eritrea
- Ethiopia
- Ghana
- Haiti
- Hong Kong^{1}
- Indonesia
- Iran
- Iraq
- Jordan
- Kenya
- Laos
- Lebanon
- Liberia
- Libya
- Macau
- Mali
- Mongolia
- Mozambique
- Nepal
- Nigeria
- North Korea
- Oman
- Pakistan
- Palestine
- Sierra Leone
- Somalia
- Sri Lanka
- Sudan
- Syria
- Timor-Leste
- Venezuela
- Vietnam
- Yemen

_{1 - Apply to both holders of Hong Kong SAR passports and holders of British National (Overseas) passports.}

In addition, holders of a residence permit issued by the visa-exempt countries listed above may enter Guatemala without a visa for up to 90 days, provided that they have resided for 3 consecutive years in the country that issued the residence permit. The stay may be extended for an additional 90 days.

=== Non-ordinary passports ===
In addition to countries whose citizens are visa-exempt, holders of diplomatic or official / service passports of Belarus, Bolivia, Burkina Faso, Cuba, Dominica, Dominican Republic, Ecuador, Egypt, Grenada, Guyana, Haiti, India, Jamaica, Jordan, Kenya, Montenegro, Morocco, Pakistan, Papua New Guinea, Philippines, Serbia, Suriname and Thailand may enter Guatemala without a visa.

=== Future changes ===
Guatemala has signed visa exemption agreements with the following countries, but they have not yet entered into force:

Country	Passports	Agreement signed on
Serbia	Ordinary	22 September 2023

== Central America-4 Border Control Agreement ==
The Central America-4 Border Control Agreement is a treaty between Guatemala, El Salvador, Honduras and Nicaragua. A visa issued by one of the four countries is honored by all four of the countries. The time period for the visa, however, applies to the total time spent in any of the four countries without leaving the CA-4 area.

== See also ==
- Central America-4 Border Control Agreement
- Visa requirements for Guatemalan citizens
