= Salvadoran passport =

Travel document

Salvadoran passport; Pasaporte salvadoreño
- Contemporary Salvadoran passport
- Type: Passport
- Issued by: El Salvador
- Purpose: Identification
- Eligibility: Salvadoran citizenship
- Expiration: 6 years after issuance for individuals

Salvadoran passports (Spanish: Pasaporte salvadoreño) are issued to citizens of El Salvador to travel outside the country.

Passports are issued by the Ministry of Foreign Affairs or, if the citizen resides abroad, at the Salvadoran embassy or consulate. Besides serving as proof of identity and of citizenship, they facilitate the process of securing assistance from Salvadoran consular officials abroad, if needed. Citizens can not have multiple Salvadoran passports at the same time.

== Appearance ==
Like all Central American passports the cover is navy with gold fonts stating the official name of the country in Spanish and in English. A map of Central America is displayed with the Salvadoran territory shaded.

== Identity information page ==
The Salvadoran passport includes the following data:

- Type ('P' - Passport)
- Code for issuing country ("SLV" - Salvadoran)
- Passport Number
- Name of bearer
- Nationality
- Date of birth
- Sex
- Mother name
- Place of birth
- Date of issue
- Date of expiry
- Booklet Number
- Issuing Authority

=== Language ===
The data page is printed in Spanish and English, while the personal data is entered in Spanish.

=== Visa pages ===
The Salvadoran passport contains 48 pages, of which one page (the first one) shows the information of the document holder, suitable for visas and border stamps.

== Central America-4 Border Control Agreement ==
The Central America-4 Border Control Agreement (CA-4) was a treaty signed in June 2006 between the Central American nations of El Salvador, Guatemala, Honduras and Nicaragua, establishing the free movement across borders between the four signatory states of their citizens without any restrictions or checks. Foreign nationals who enter one of the signatory countries can also travel to other signatory states without having to obtain additional permits or to undergo checks at border checkpoints.

Countries	CA-4	ID Travel
Guatemala	Yes	Yes
Honduras	Yes	Yes
Nicaragua	Yes	Yes
Costa Rica	No	No
Panama	No	No

== Visa requirements for Salvadoran citizens ==
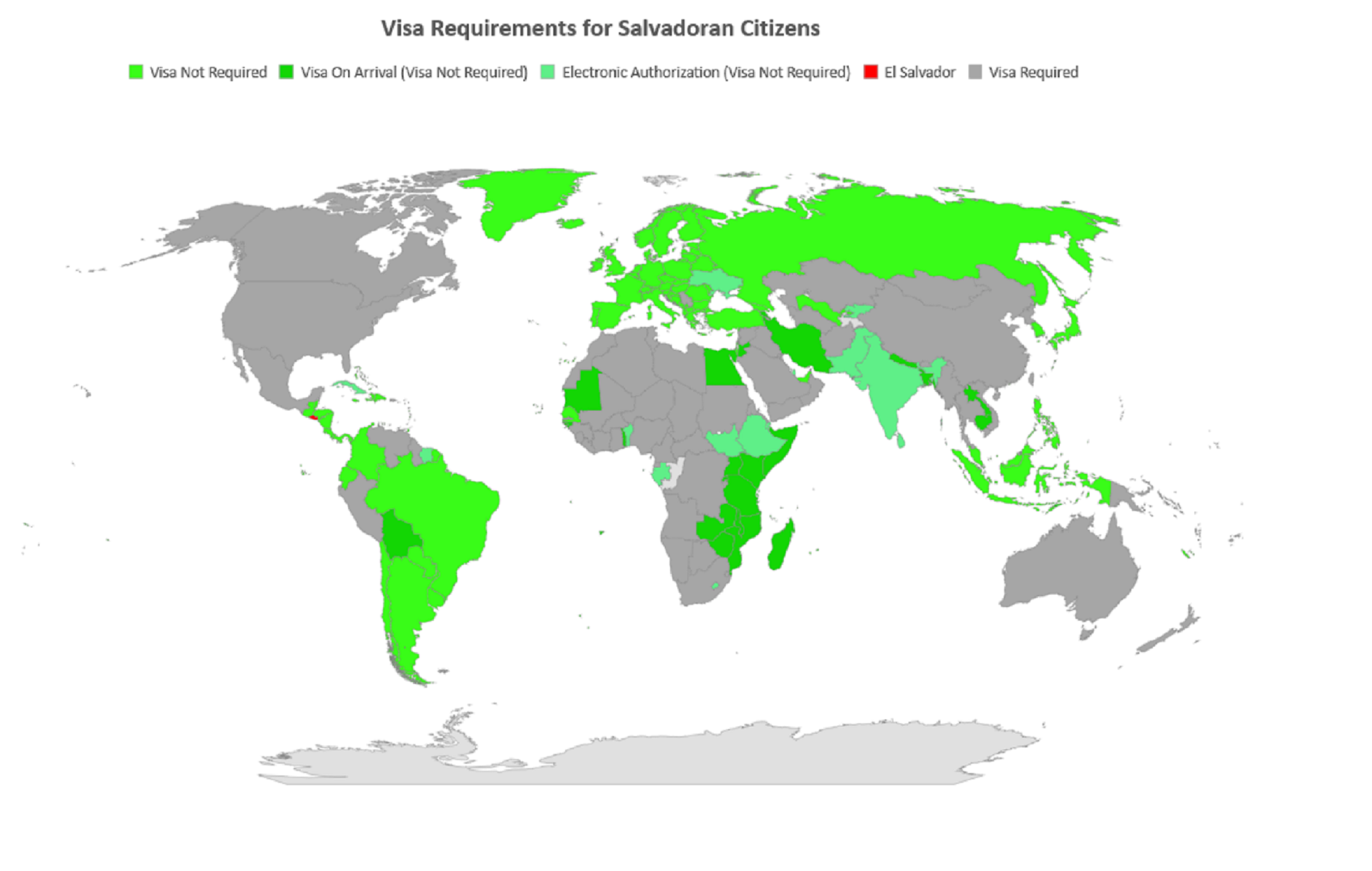
Visa requirements for El Salvador citizens

As of 2024, Salvadoran citizens had visa-free or visa free access to 134 countries and territories, ranking the Salvadoran passport 38th in terms of travel freedom according to the Henley visa restrictions index.

== See also ==
- Central America-4 passport
- Visa requirements for El Salvador citizens
- Visa policy of El Salvador
- List of diplomatic missions of El Salvador
- Ministry of Foreign Affairs of El Salvador
