= List of diplomatic missions of El Salvador =

This is a list of diplomatic missions of El Salvador, excluding honorary consulates. El Salvador is a small Central American country with a modest number of diplomatic missions abroad.

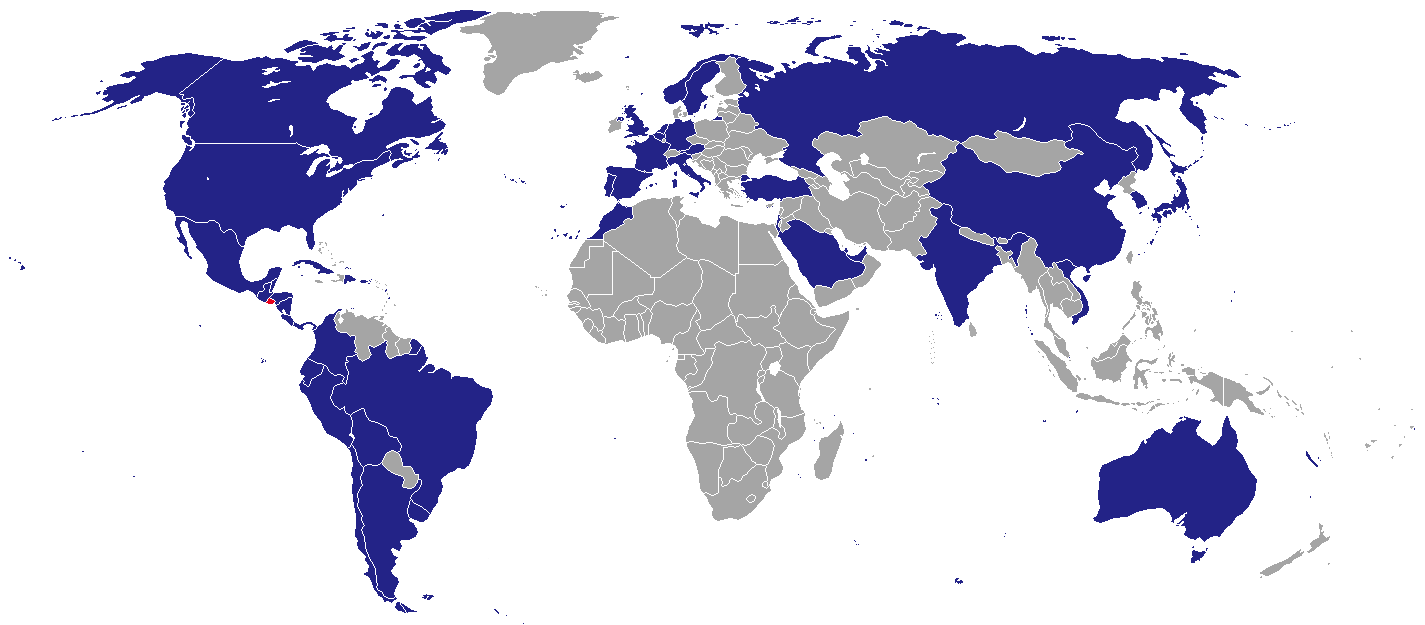
Countries with diplomatic missions of El Salvador

== Current missions ==
=== Africa ===
| Host country | Host city | Mission | Concurrent accreditation | Ref. |
|---|---|---|---|---|
| Morocco | Rabat | Embassy | Countries: Ethiopia; Kenya; Mali; Senegal; Togo | |

=== Americas ===
| Host country | Host city | Mission | Concurrent accreditation | Ref. |
|---|---|---|---|---|
| Argentina | Buenos Aires | Embassy | Country: Paraguay | |
| Belize | Belmopan | Embassy | | |
| Bolivia | La Paz | Embassy | | |
| Brazil | Brasília | Embassy | | |
| Canada | Ottawa | Embassy | | |
| Canada | Calgary | Consulate-General | | |
| Canada | Montreal | Consulate-General | | |
| Canada | Toronto | Consulate-General | | |
| Canada | Vancouver | Consulate-General | | |
| Canada | Winnipeg | Consulate-General | | |
| Chile | Santiago de Chile | Embassy | | |
| Colombia | Bogotá | Embassy | | |
| Costa Rica | San José | Embassy | | |
| Cuba | Havana | Embassy | Country: Jamaica | |
| Dominican Republic | Santo Domingo | Embassy | Countries: Haiti; Saint Kitts and Nevis; Saint Vincent and the Grenadines; Suriname | |
| Ecuador | Quito | Embassy | | |
| Guatemala | Guatemala City | Embassy | | |
| Honduras | Tegucigalpa | Embassy | | |
| Honduras | Choluteca | Consulate-General | | |
| Honduras | San Pedro Sula | Consulate-General | | |
| Mexico | Mexico City | Embassy | | |
| Mexico | Acayucan | Consulate-General | | |
| Mexico | Ciudad Juárez | Consulate-General | | |
| Mexico | Guadalajara | Consulate-General | | |
| Mexico | Monterrey | Consulate-General | | |
| Mexico | Oaxaca City | Consulate-General | | |
| Mexico | San Luis Potosí City | Consulate-General | | |
| Mexico | Tapachula | Consulate-General | | |
| Mexico | Tijuana | Consulate-General | | |
| Mexico | Villahermosa | Consulate-General | | |
| Nicaragua | Managua | Embassy | | |
| Panama | Panama City | Embassy | | |
| Peru | Lima | Embassy | | |
| United States | Washington, D.C. | Embassy | | |
| United States | Aurora (Colorado) | Consulate-General | | |
| United States | Boston (Massachusetts) | Consulate-General | | |
| United States | Charlotte (North Carolina) | Consulate-General | | |
| United States | Chicago (Illinois) | Consulate-General | | |
| United States | Dallas (Texas) | Consulate-General | | |
| United States | Doral (Florida) | Consulate-General | | |
| United States | Duluth (Georgia) | Consulate-General | | |
| United States | El Paso (Texas) | Consulate-General | | |
| United States | Elizabeth (New Jersey) | Consulate-General | | |
| United States | Fresno (California) | Consulate-General | | |
| United States | Houston (Texas) | Consulate-General | | |
| United States | Las Vegas (Nevada) | Consulate-General | | |
| United States | Los Angeles (California) | Consulate-General | | |
| United States | McAllen (Texas) | Consulate-General | | |
| United States | Nashville (Tennessee) | Consulate-General | | |
| United States | New York City (New York) | Consulate-General | | |
| United States | Omaha (Nebraska) | Consulate-General | | |
| United States | Plainview (New York) | Consulate-General | | |
| United States | Saint Paul (Minnesota) | Consulate-General | | |
| United States | Salt Lake City (Utah) | Consulate-General | | |
| United States | San Antonio (Texas) | Consulate-General | | |
| United States | San Bernardino (California) | Consulate-General | | |
| United States | San Francisco (California) | Consulate-General | | |
| United States | Seattle (Washington) | Consulate-General | | |
| United States | Silver Spring (Maryland) | Consulate-General | | |
| United States | Springdale (Arkansas) | Consulate-General | | |
| United States | Tucson (Arizona) | Consulate-General | | |
| United States | Woodbridge (Virginia) | Consulate-General | | |
| Uruguay | Montevideo | Embassy | | |

=== Asia ===
| Host country | Host city | Mission | Concurrent accreditation | Ref. |
|---|---|---|---|---|
| China | Beijing | Embassy | | |
| India | New Delhi | Embassy | Countries: Bangladesh; Maldives; Nepal; Sri Lanka; Thailand | |
| Israel | Tel Aviv | Embassy | Countries: Egypt; Mauritius; Namibia; South Africa | |
| Japan | Tokyo | Embassy | Countries: Micronesia; Tuvalu | |
| Qatar | Doha | Embassy | Countries: Pakistan; Palestine | |
| Saudi Arabia | Riyadh | Embassy | Countries: Bahrain; Jordan; Kuwait; Lebanon; Oman | |
| Singapore | Singapore | Embassy | | |
| South Korea | Seoul | Embassy | Countries: Cambodia; Malaysia; Philippines | |
| Turkey | Ankara | Embassy | Countries: Albania; Azerbaijan; Georgia; North Macedonia | |
| United Arab Emirates | Abu Dhabi | Embassy | | |
| Vietnam | Hanoi | Embassy | | |

=== Europe ===
| Host country | Host city | Mission | Concurrent accreditation | Ref. |
|---|---|---|---|---|
| Austria | Vienna | Embassy | Countries: Bulgaria; Croatia; Hungary; Romania; Slovakia; International Organizations: United Nations | |
| Belgium | Brussels | Embassy | Country: Luxembourg; International Organizations: European Union | |
| France | Paris | Embassy | Countries: Algeria; Ivory Coast; Monaco; International Organizations: UNESCO | |
| Germany | Berlin | Embassy | Countries: Czech Republic; Poland; Ukraine | |
| Holy See (Note: The Salvadoran Embassy to the Holy See is located outside Vatican territory in Rome.) | Rome | Embassy | Countries and Sovereign entity: Malta; San Marino; Sovereign Military Order of Malta | |
| Italy | Rome | Embassy | Countries: Cyprus; Greece; Tunisia; International Organizations: Food and Agriculture Organization; International Fund for Agricultural Development; World Food Programme | |
| Italy | Milan | Consulate-General | Countries: Cyprus; Greece; Tunisia; International Organizations: Food and Agriculture Organization; International Fund for Agricultural Development; World Food Programme | |
| Netherlands | The Hague | Embassy | | |
| Norway | Oslo | Embassy | | |
| Portugal | Lisbon | Embassy | | |
| Russia | Moscow | Embassy | Countries: Armenia; Belarus; Kazakhstan; Kyrgyzstan; Tajikistan; Turkmenistan; Uzbekistan | |
| Spain | Madrid | Embassy | Country: Andorra | |
| Spain | Madrid | Consulate-General | Country: Andorra | |
| Spain | Barcelona | Consulate-General | Country: Andorra | |
| Spain | Seville | Consulate-General | Country: Andorra | |
| Sweden | Stockholm | Embassy | Countries: Denmark; Estonia; Finland; Iceland; Latvia; Lithuania | |
| United Kingdom | London | Embassy | Country: Ireland | |

=== Oceania ===
| Host country | Host city | Mission | Concurrent accreditation | Ref. |
|---|---|---|---|---|
| Australia | Canberra | Embassy | Countries: Fiji; Indonesia; New Zealand; Samoa; Solomon Islands; Timor Leste | |
| Australia | Melbourne | Consulate-General | Countries: Fiji; Indonesia; New Zealand; Samoa; Solomon Islands; Timor Leste | |

=== Multilateral organizations ===
| Organization | Host city | Host country | Mission | Concurrent accreditation | Ref. |
|---|---|---|---|---|---|
| Organization of American States | Washington, D.C. | United States | Permanent Mission | | |
| United Nations | New York City | United States | Permanent Mission | | |
| United Nations | Geneva | Switzerland | Permanent Mission | Country: Switzerland | |

== Gallery ==
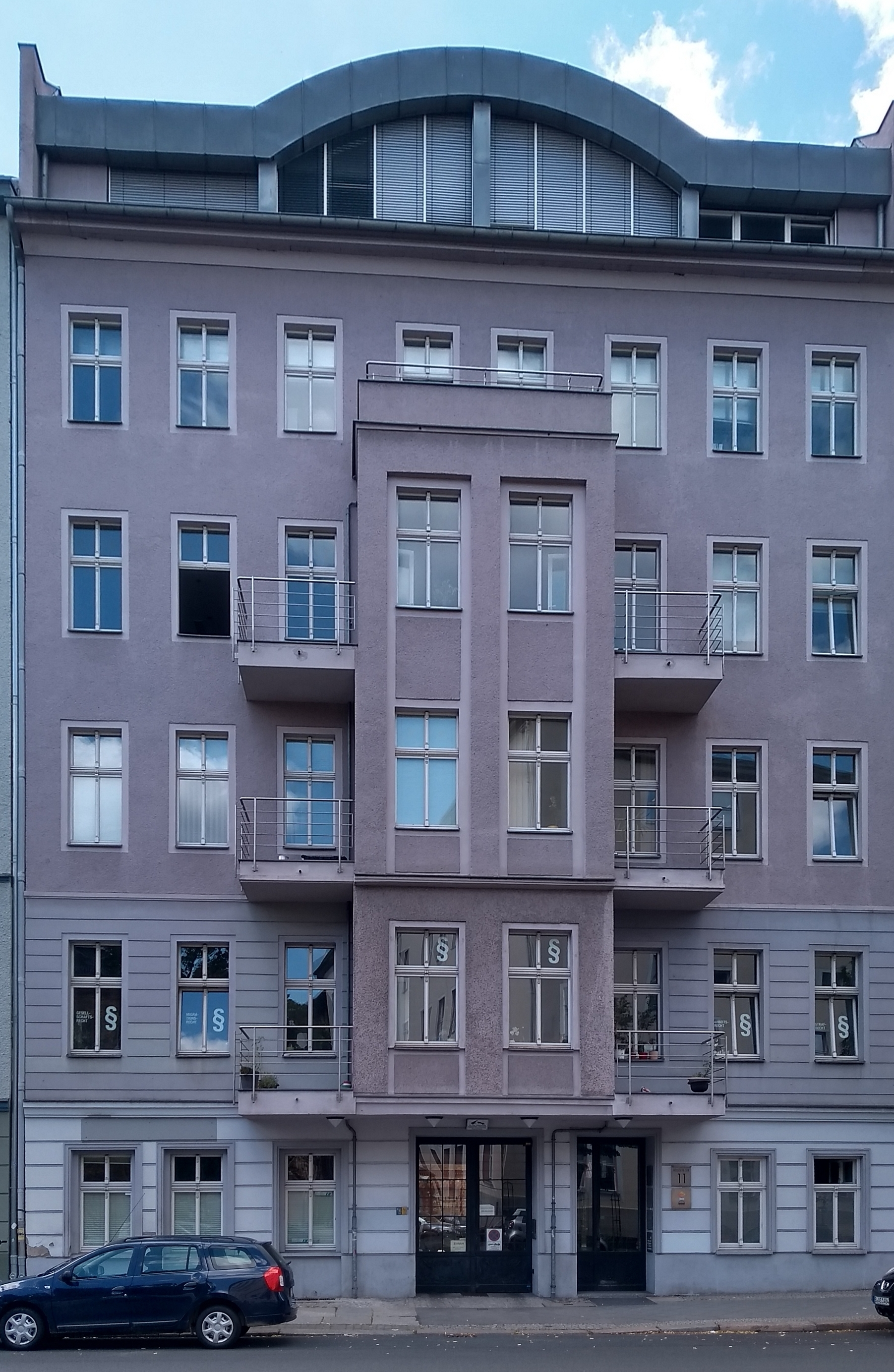
Building hosting the Embassy in Berlin

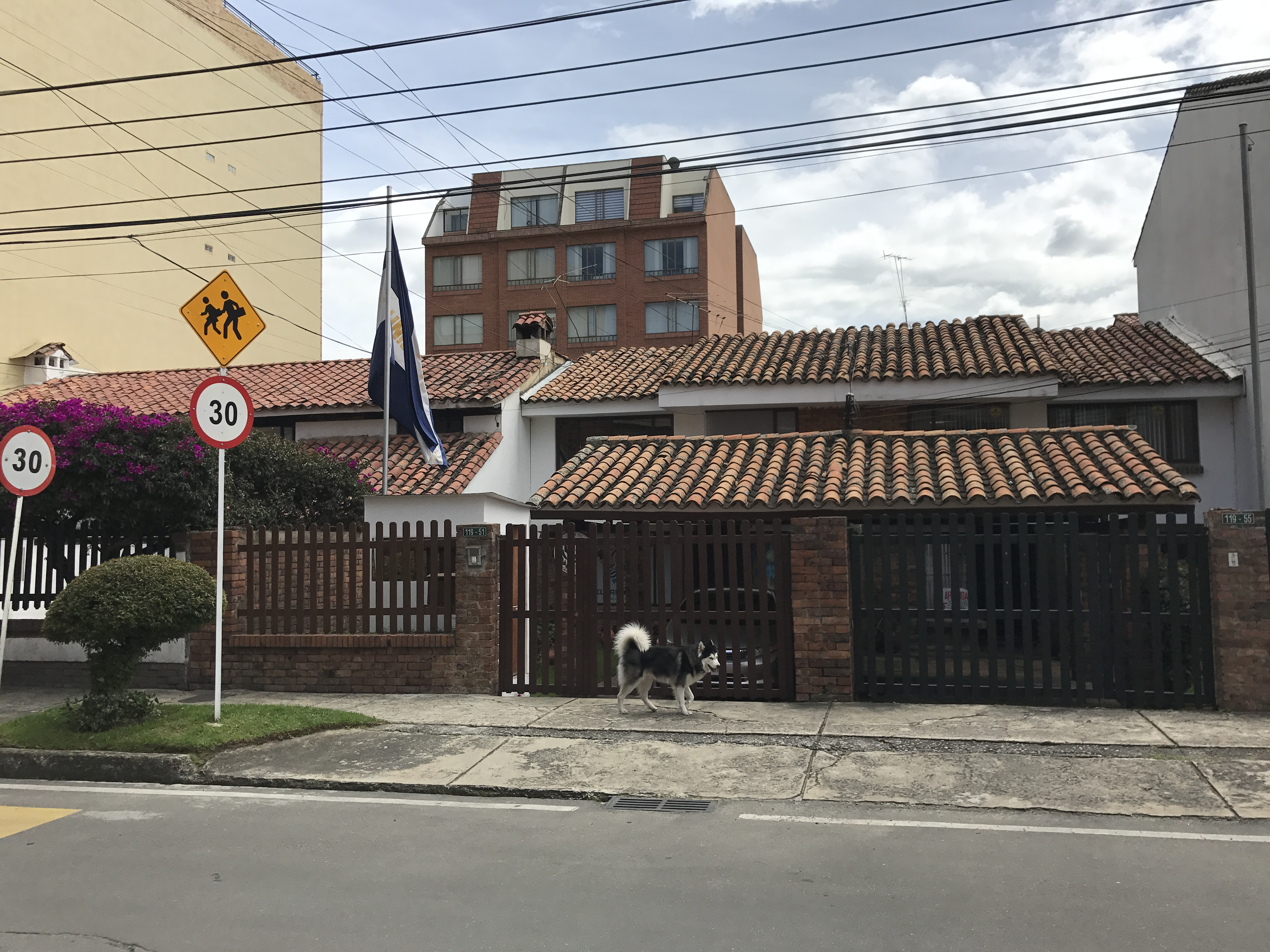
Embassy in Bogotá

Embassy in Lima

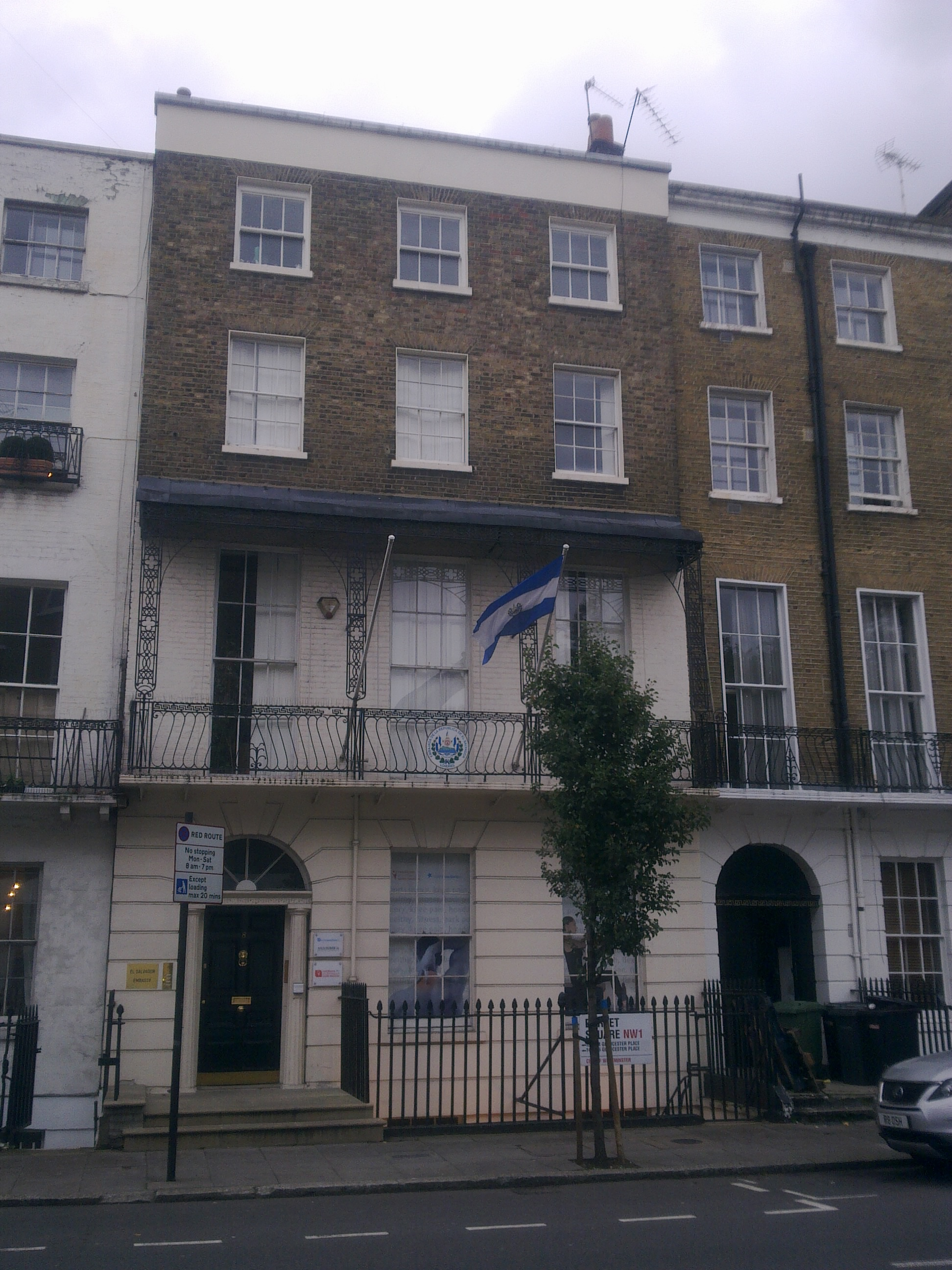
Embassy in London

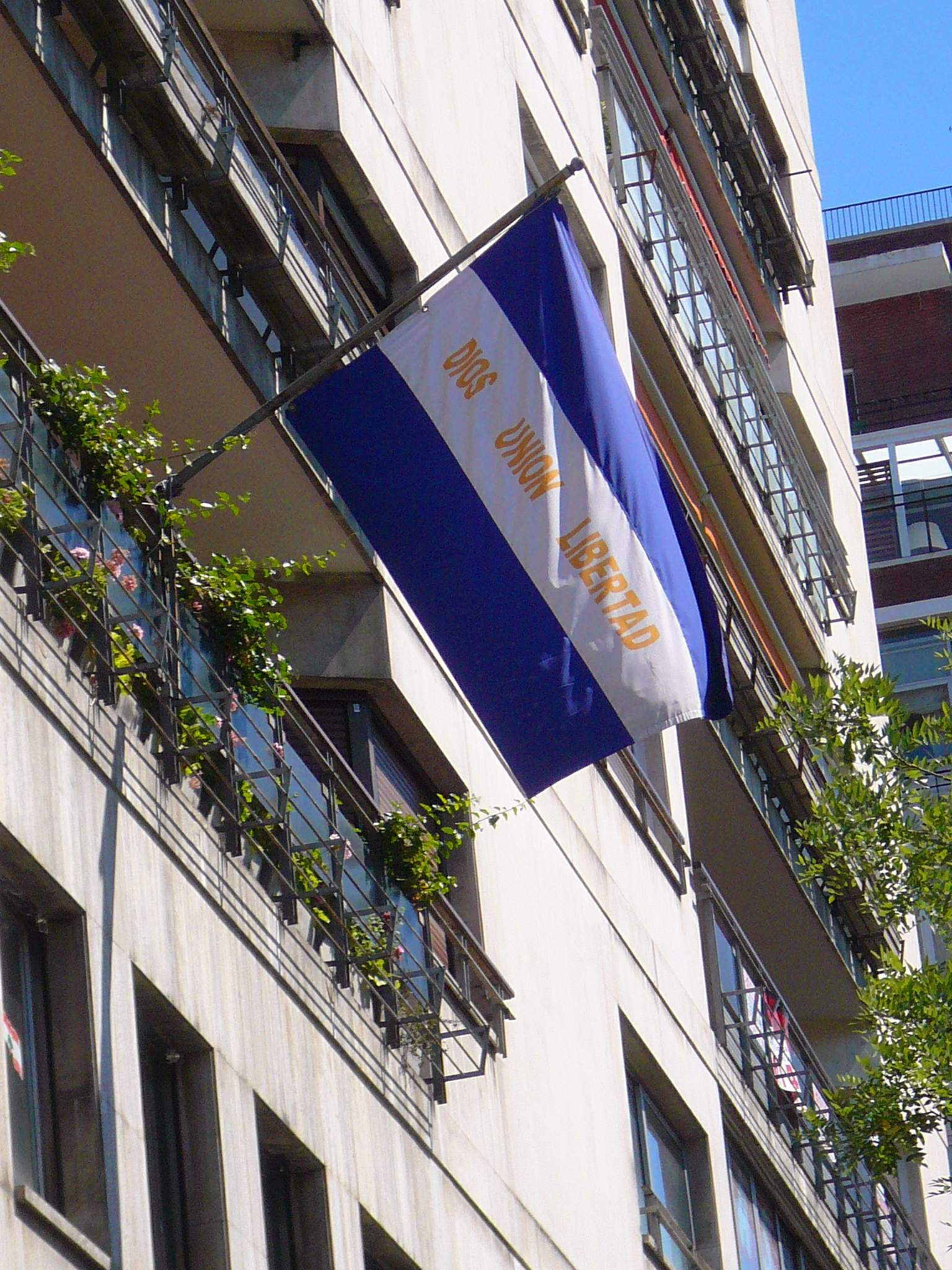
Embassy in Madrid

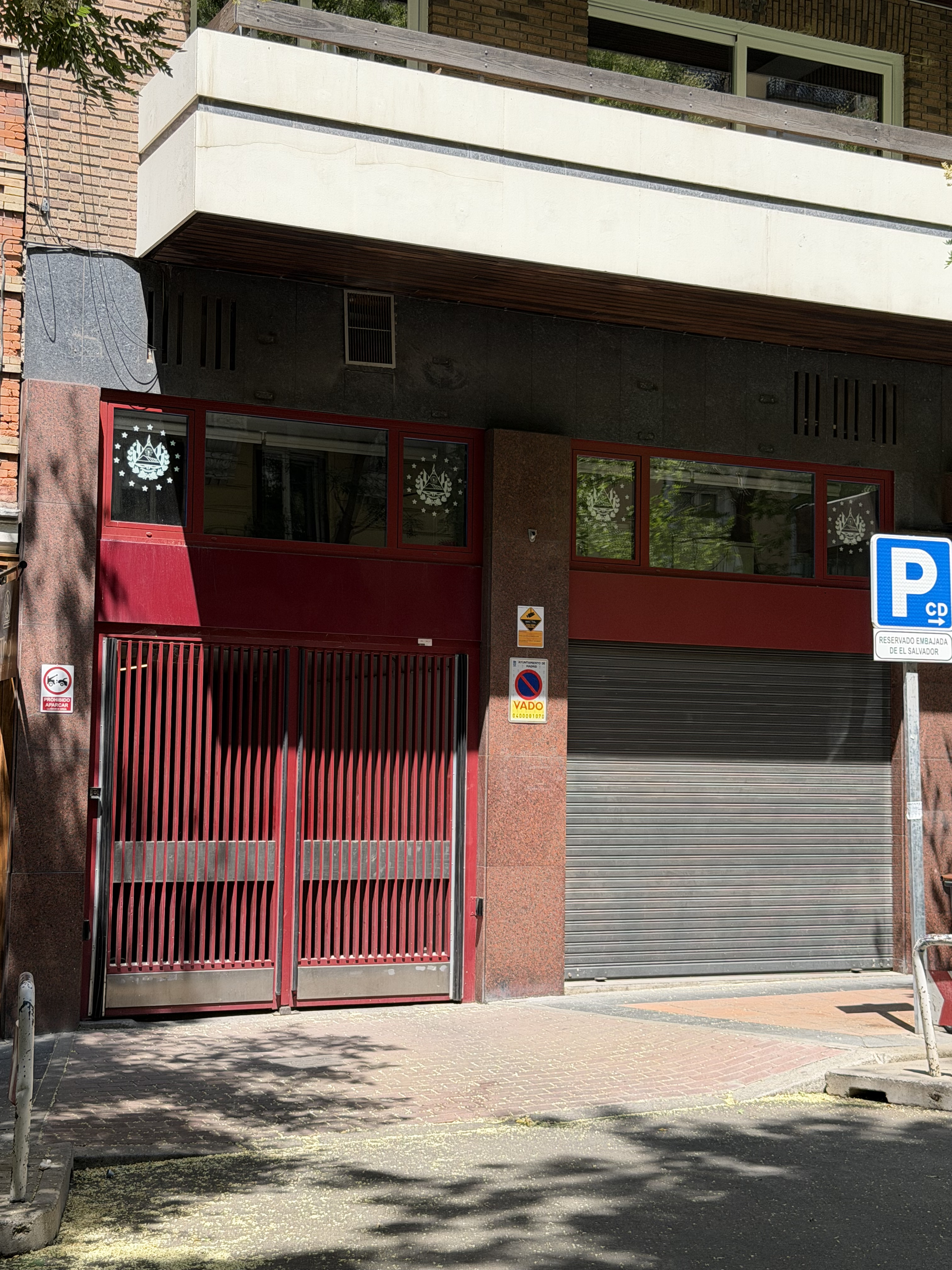
Consulate-General in Madrid

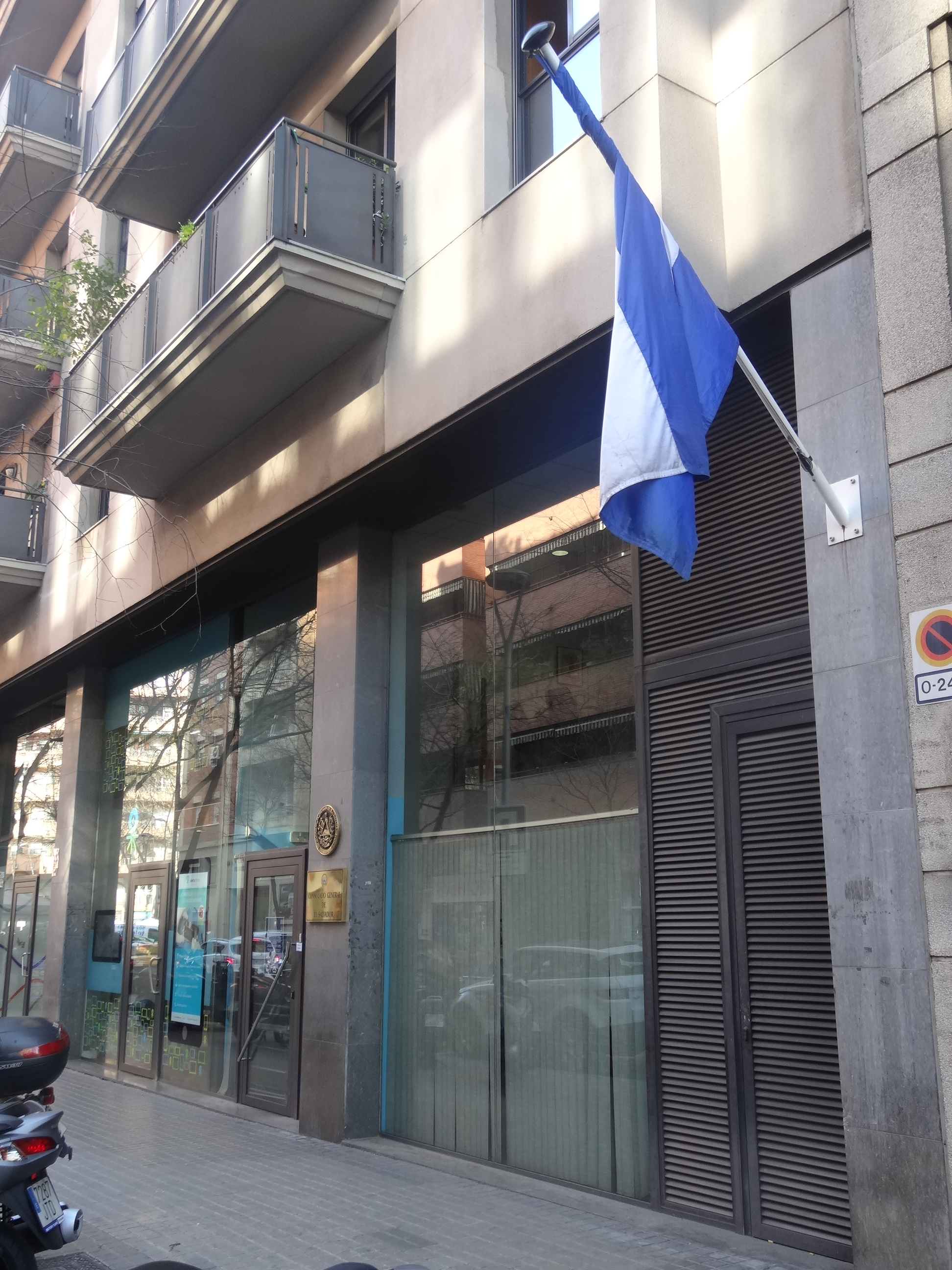
Consulate-General in Barcelona

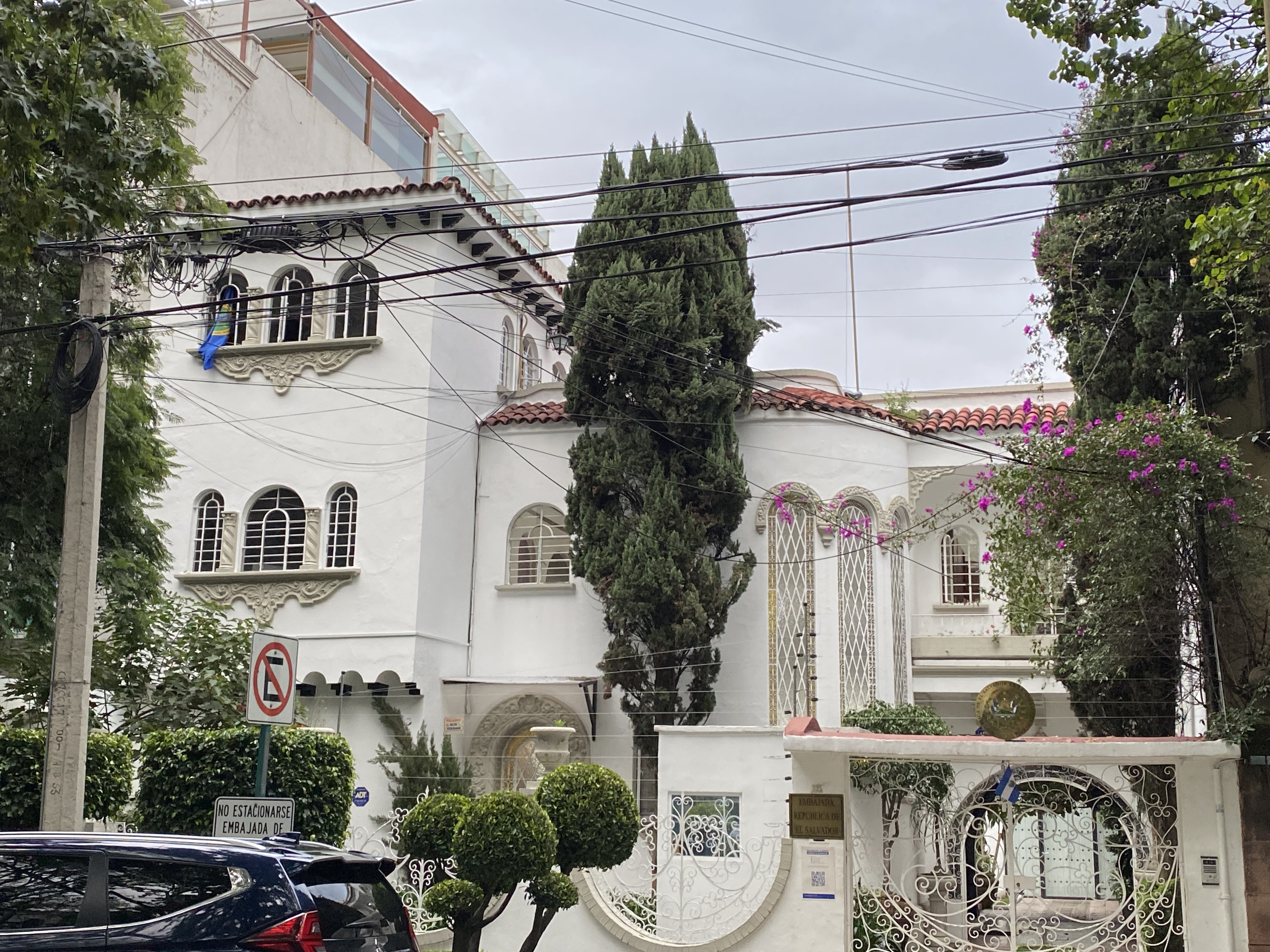
Embassy in Mexico City

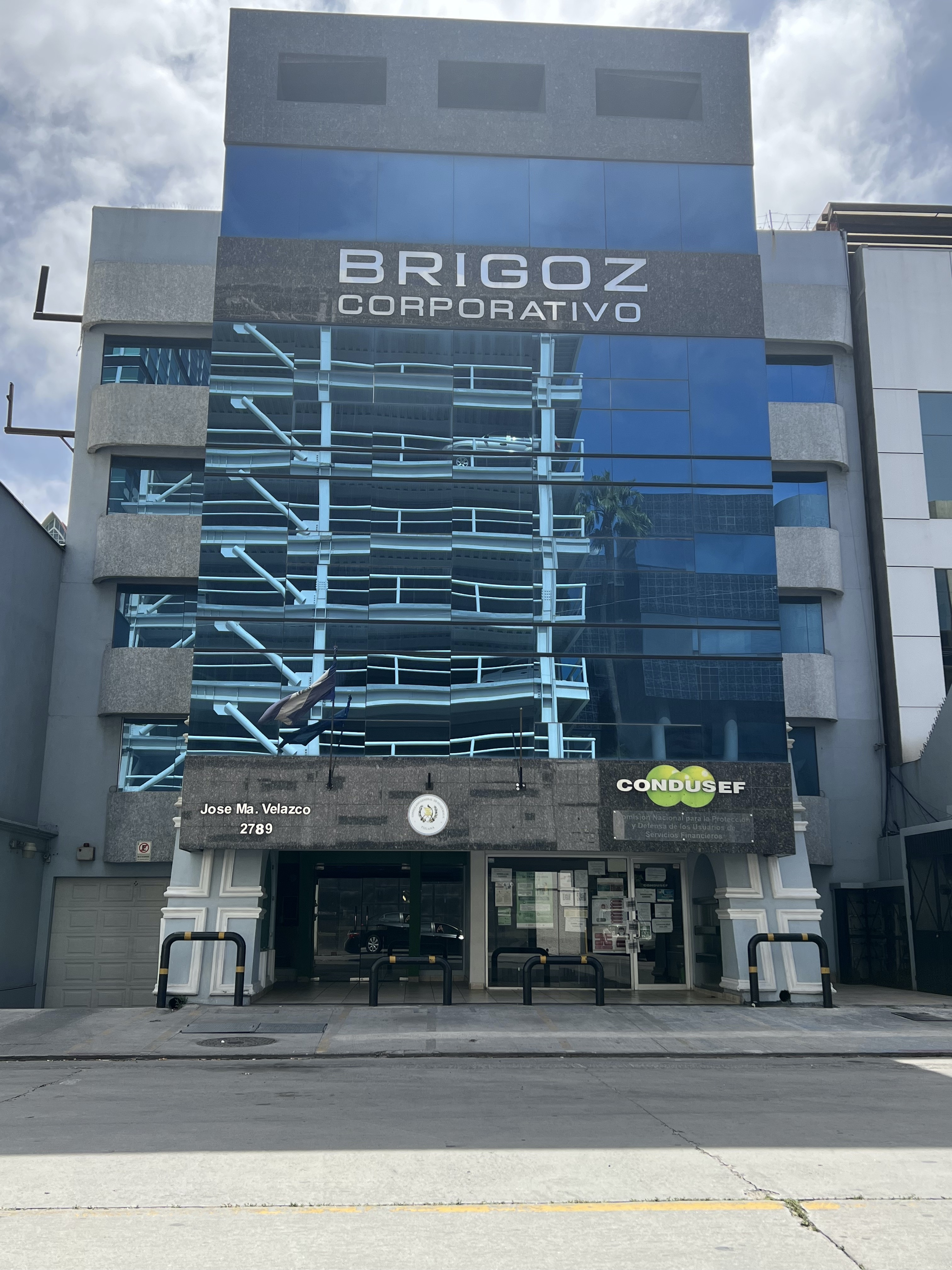
Building hosting the Consulate-General in Tijuana

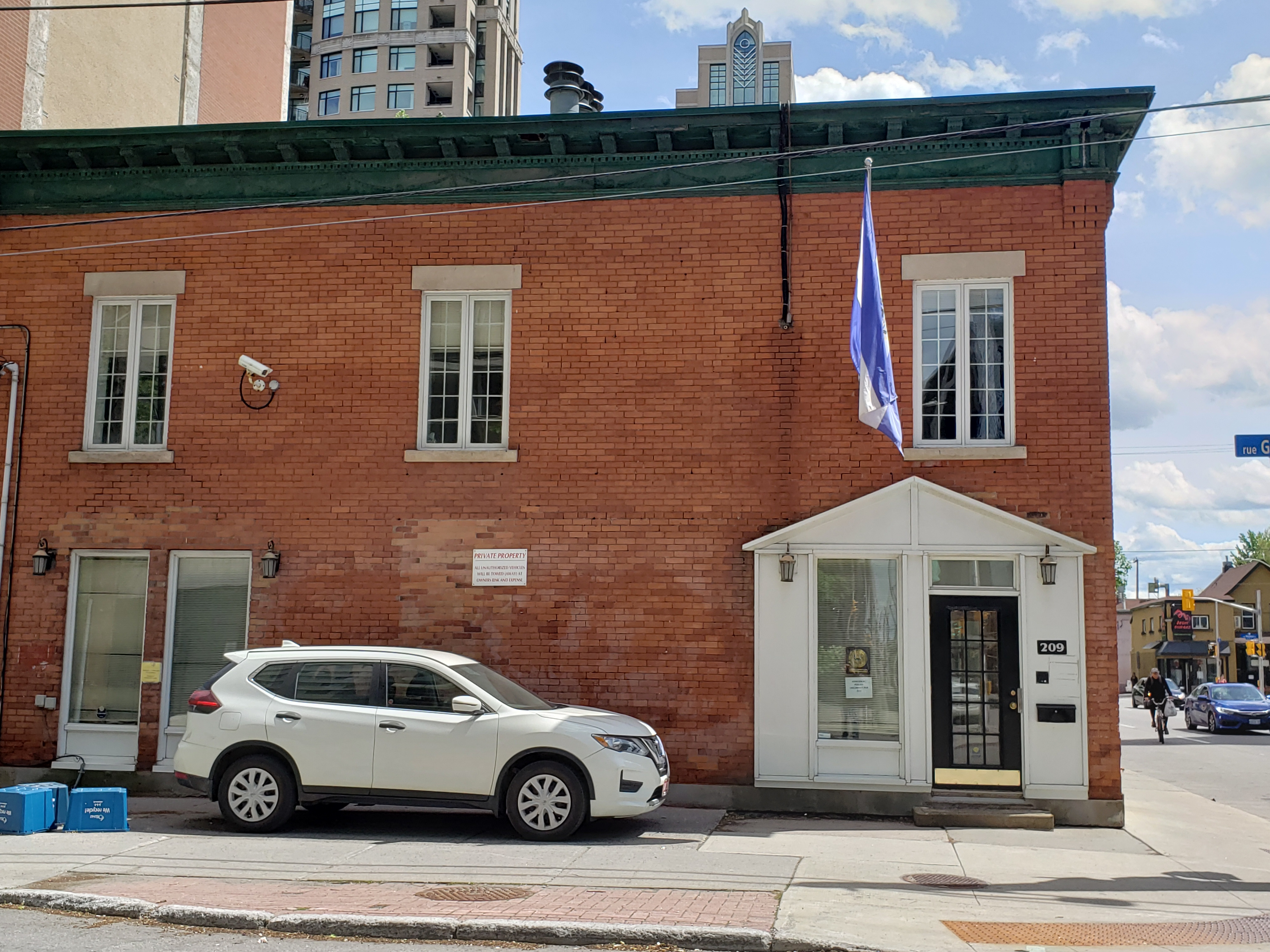
Embassy in Ottawa

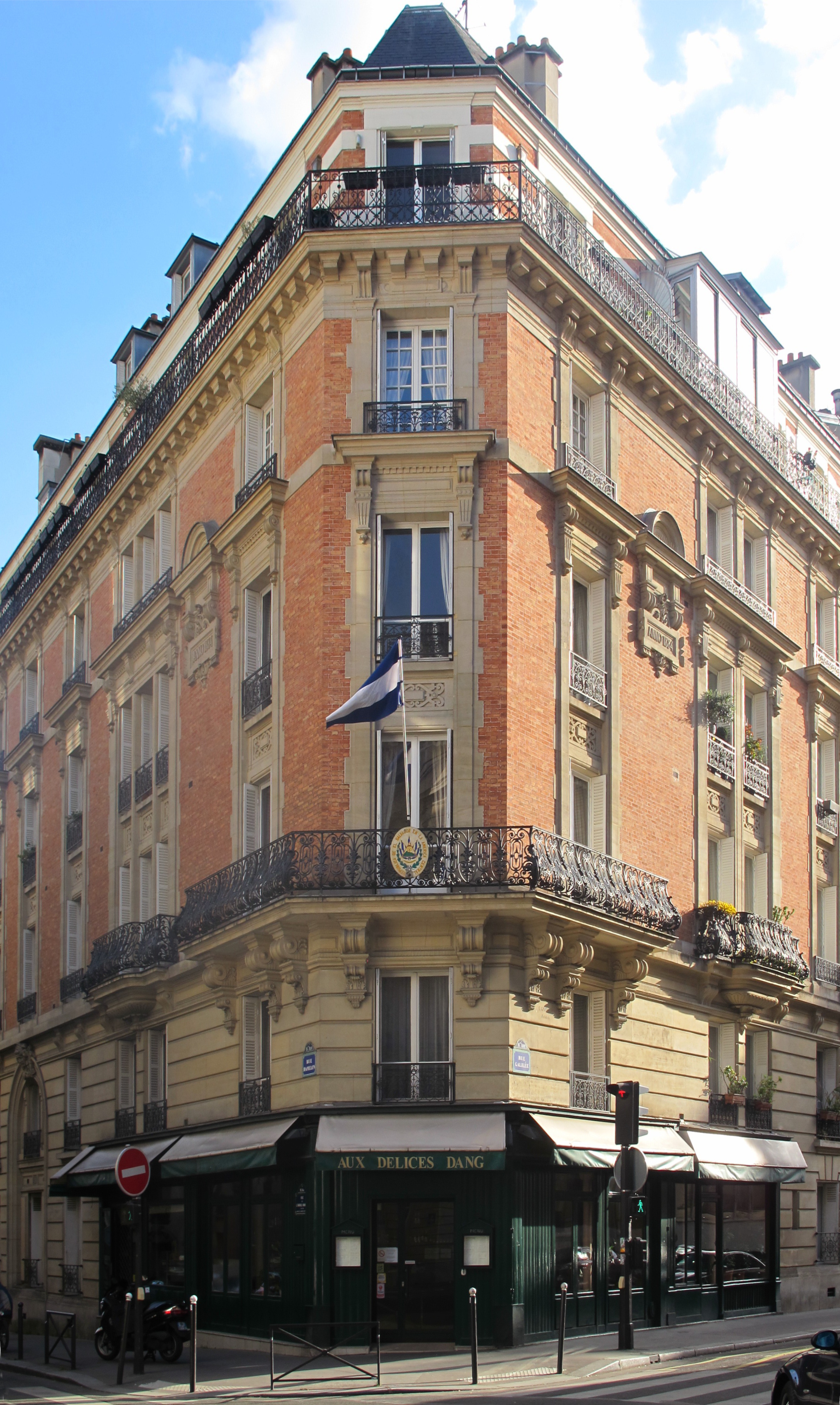
Building hosting the Embassy in Paris

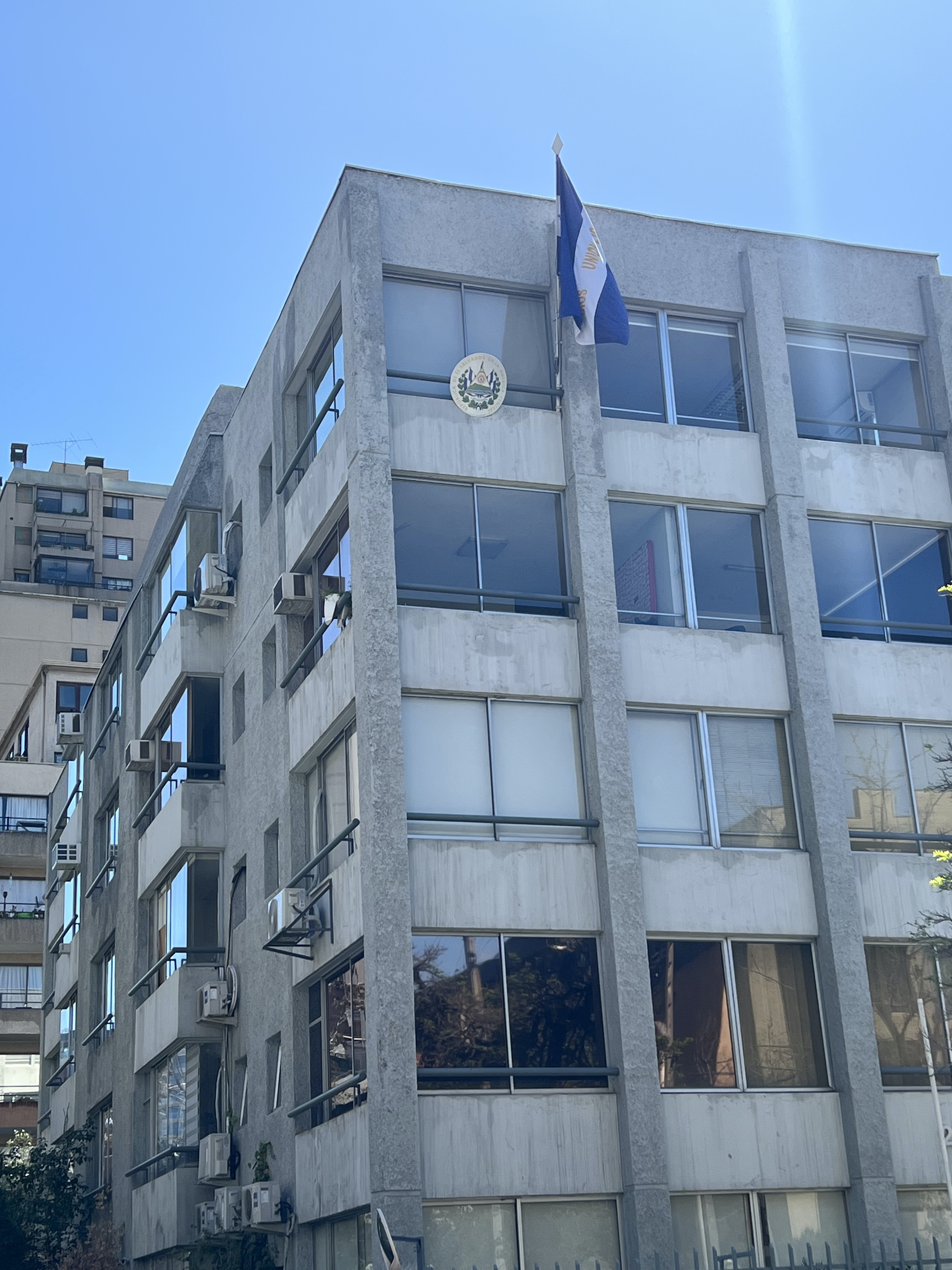
Embassy in Santiago de Chile

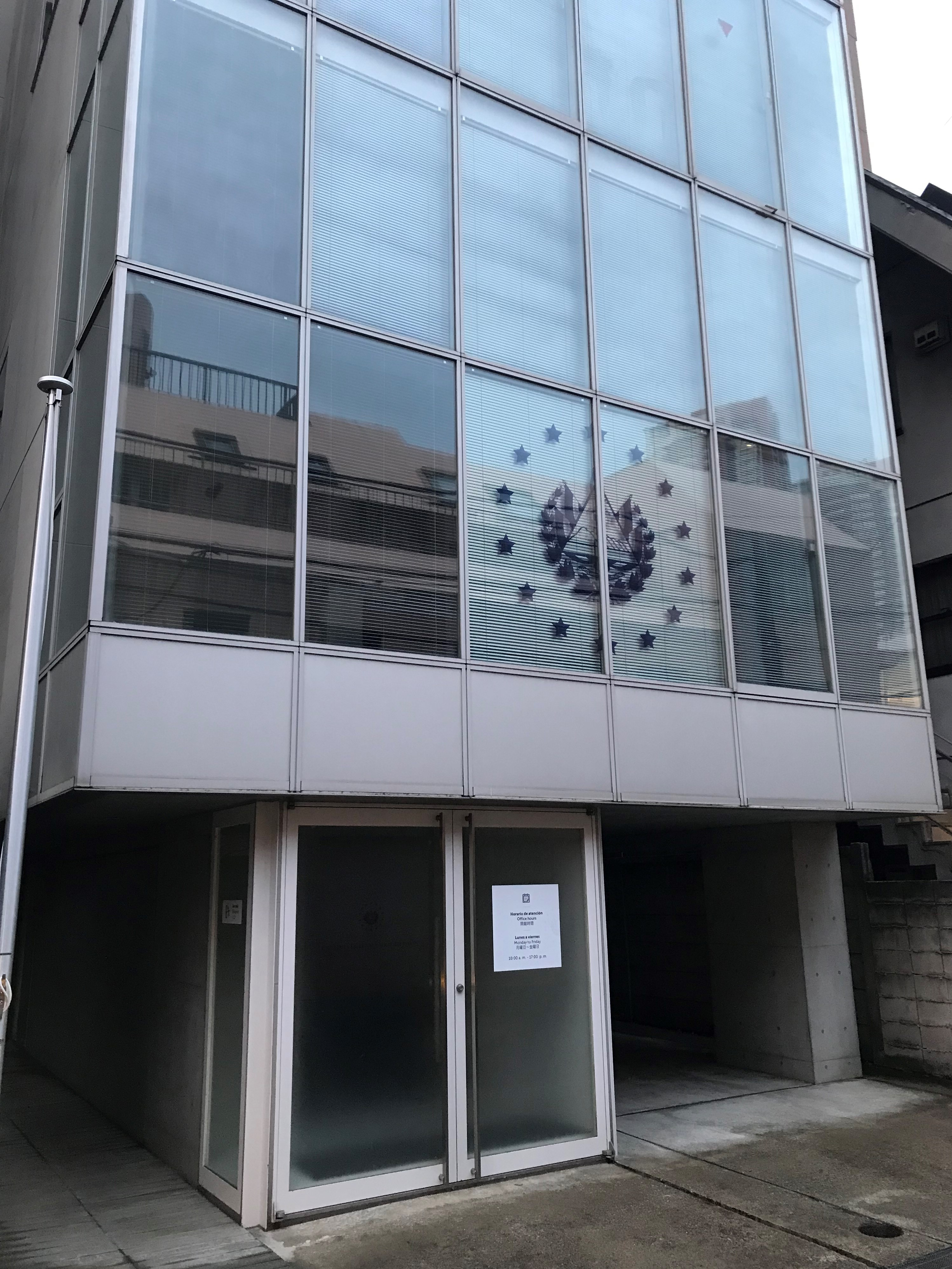
Embassy in Tokyo

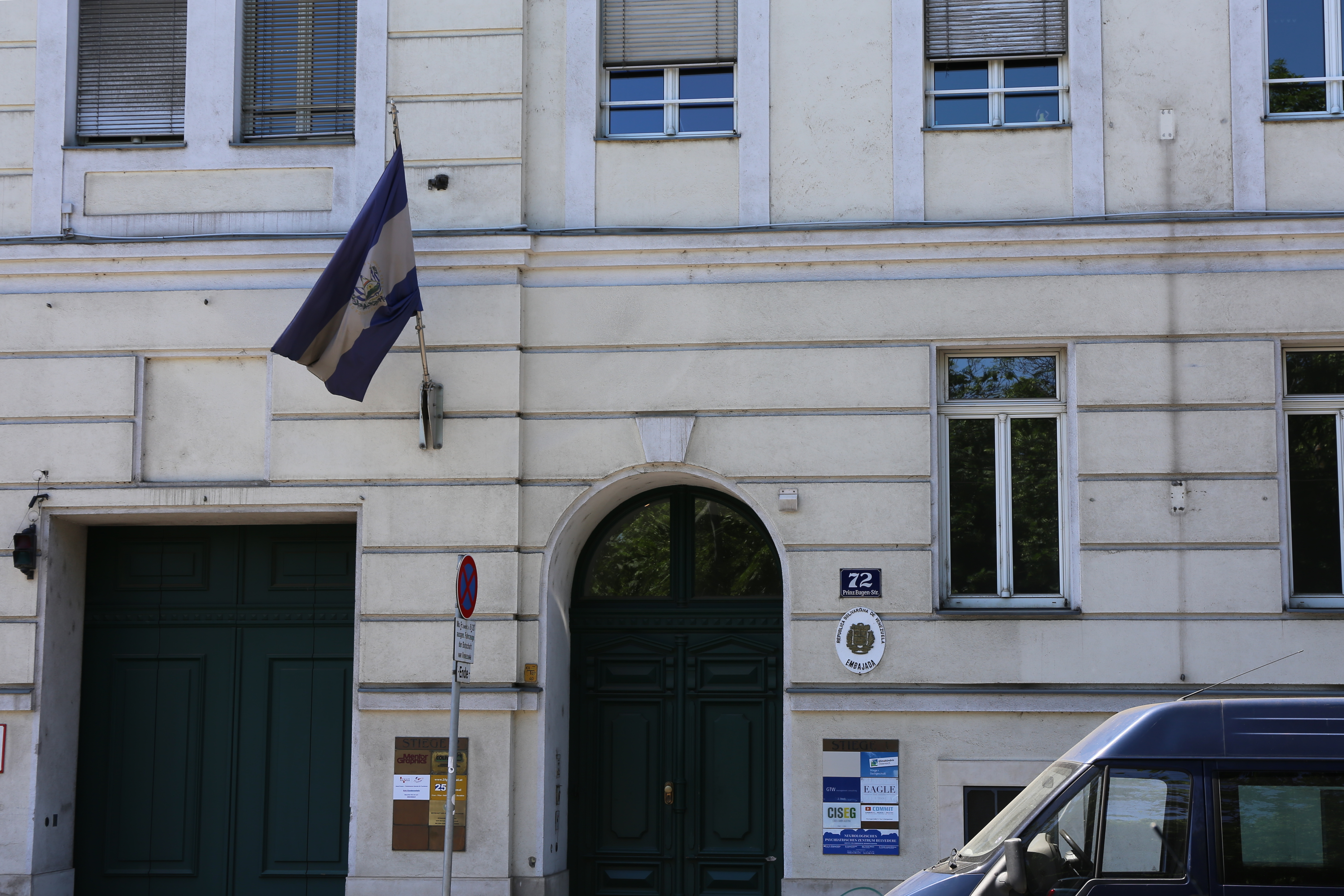
Embassy in Vienna

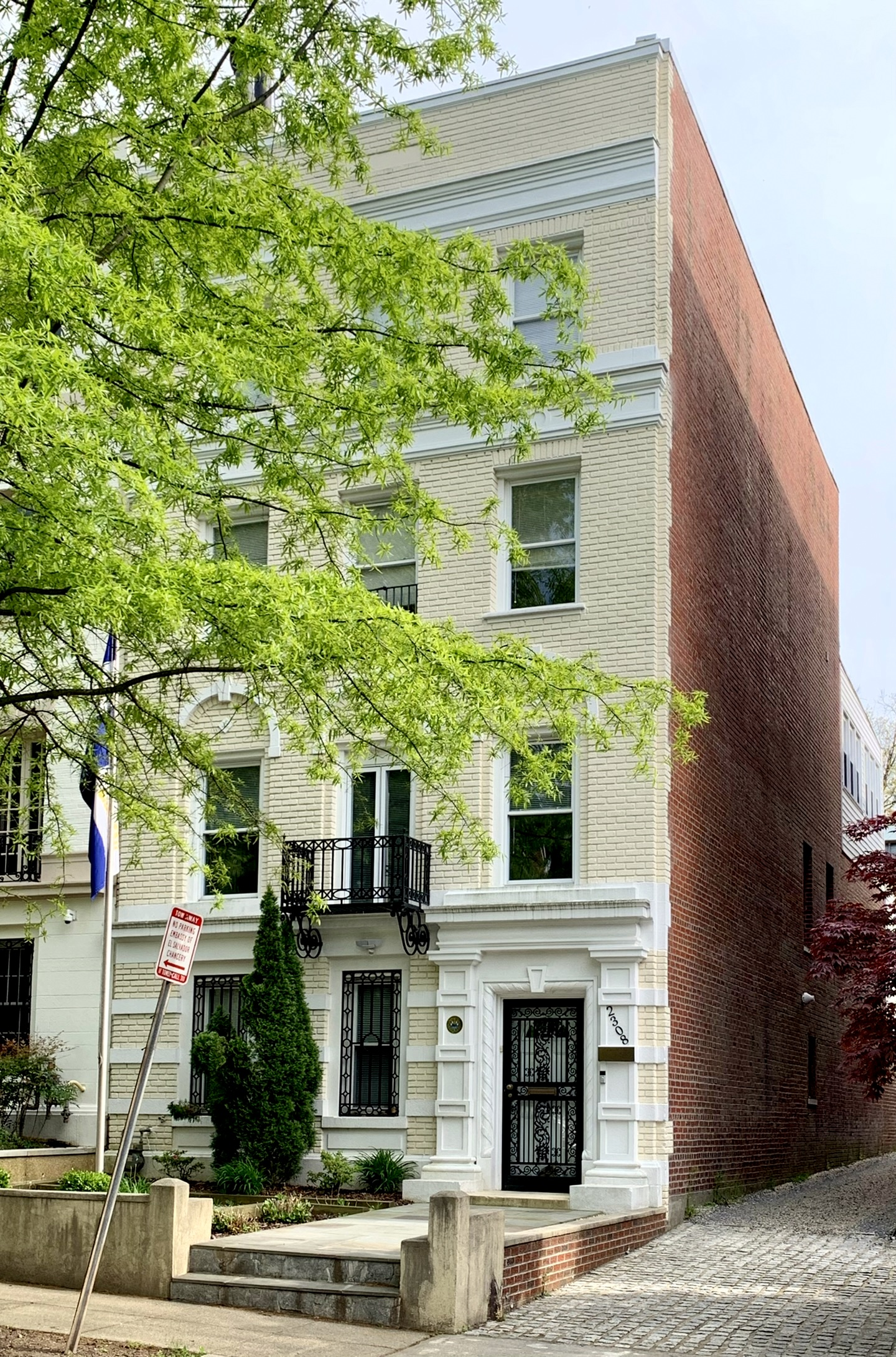
Permanent Mission to the Organization of American States in Washington, D.C.

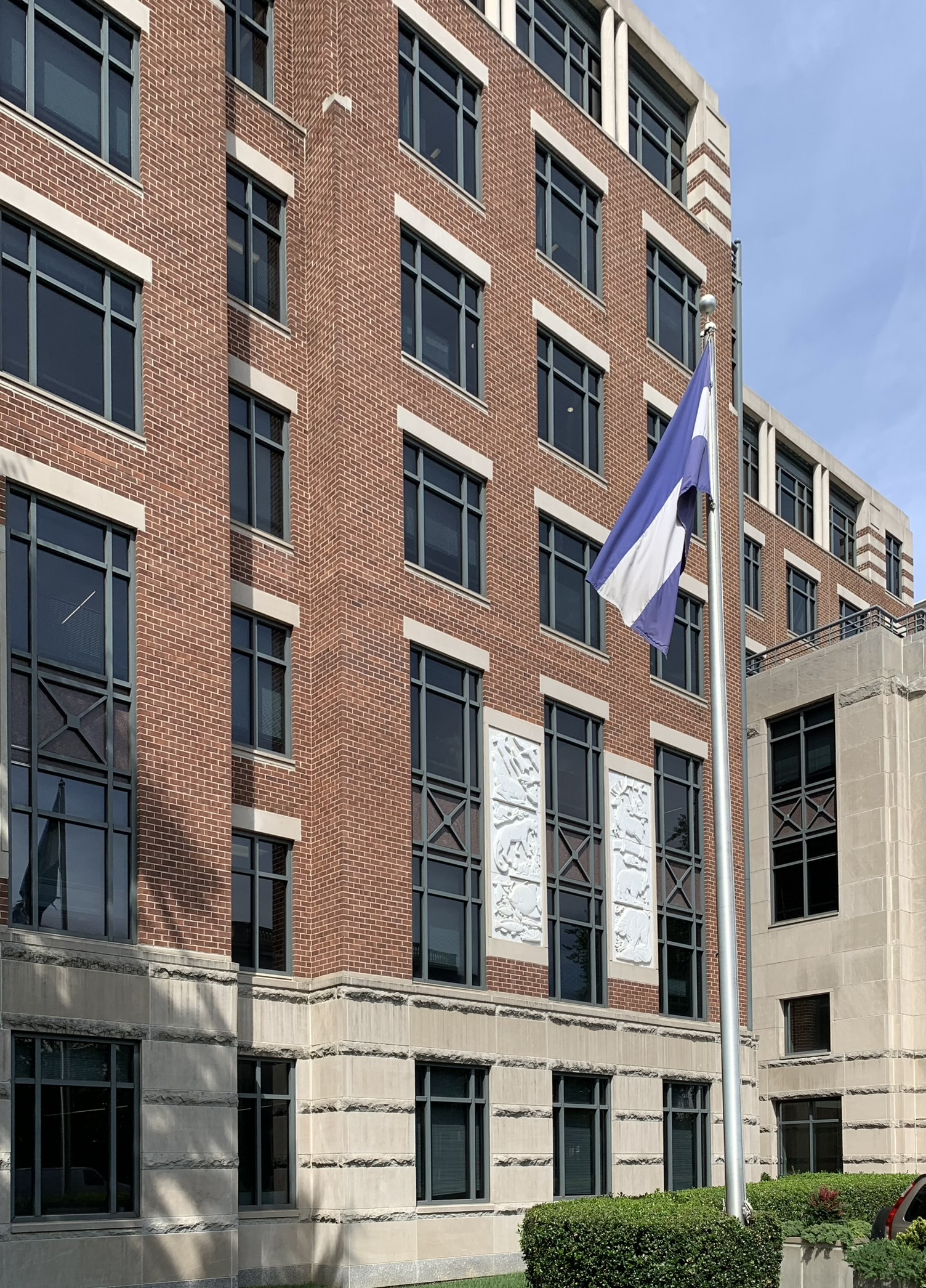
Building hosting the Embassy in Washington, D.C.

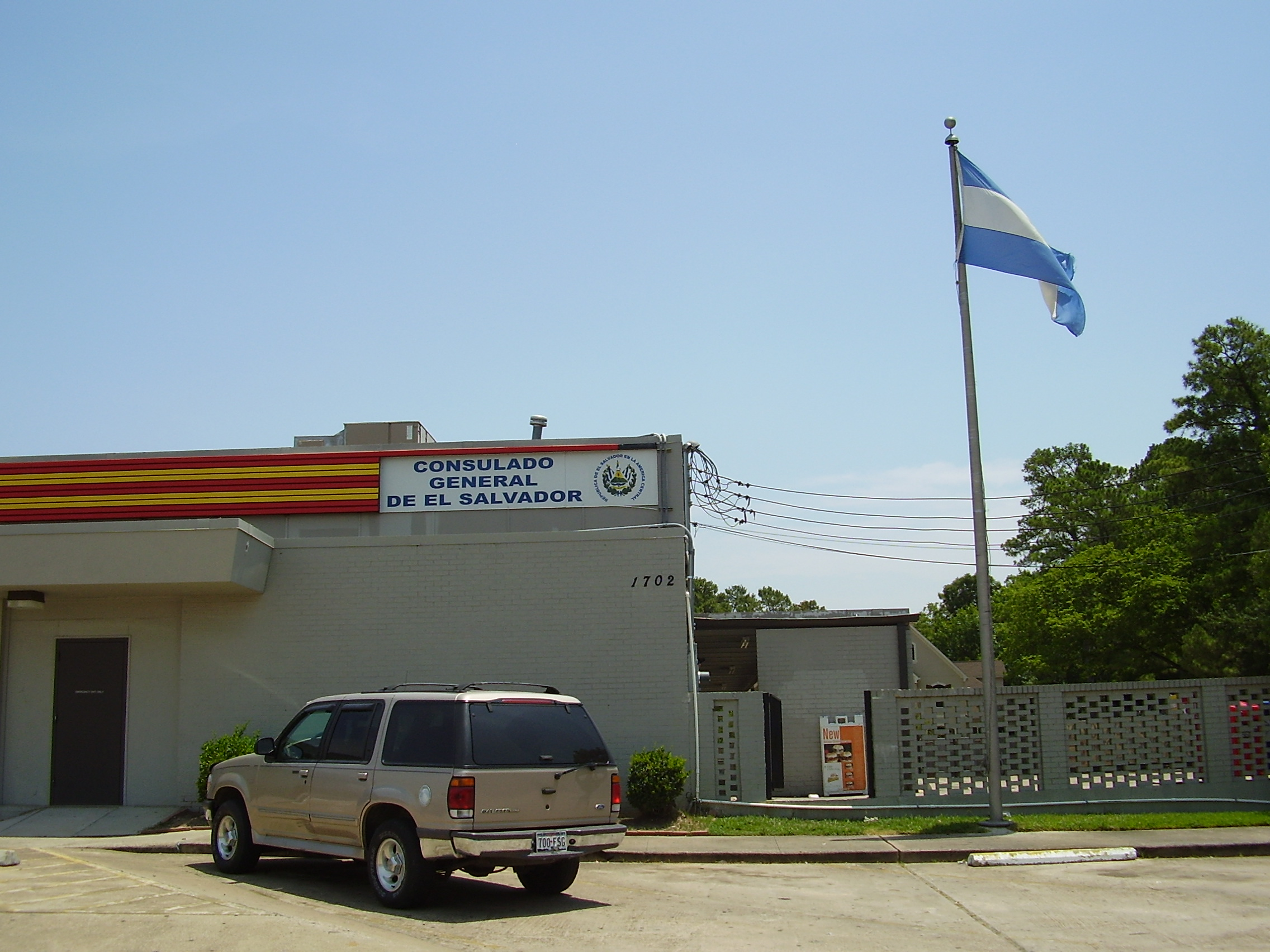
Consulate-General in Houston

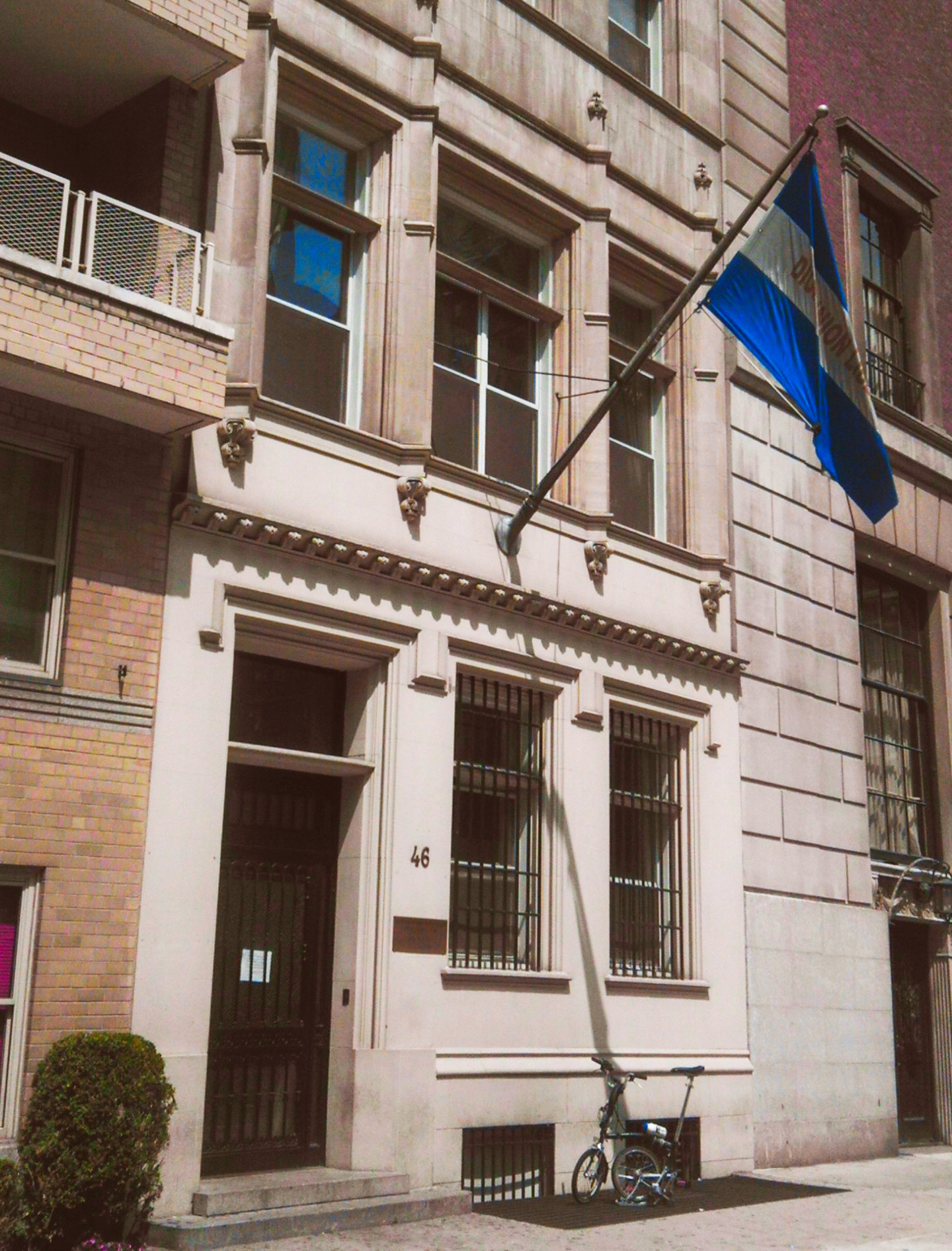
Consulate-General in New York City

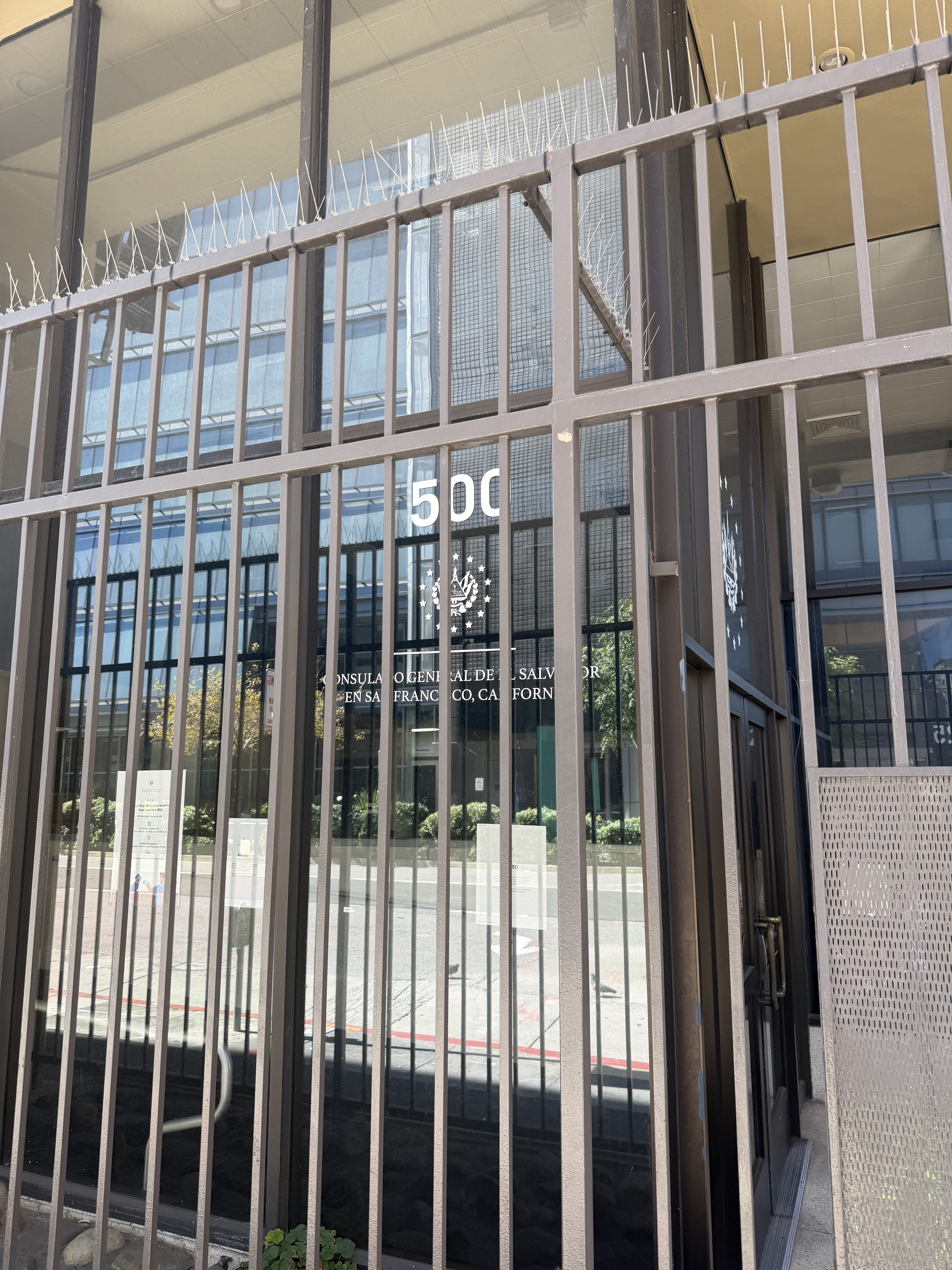
Consulate-General in San Francisco

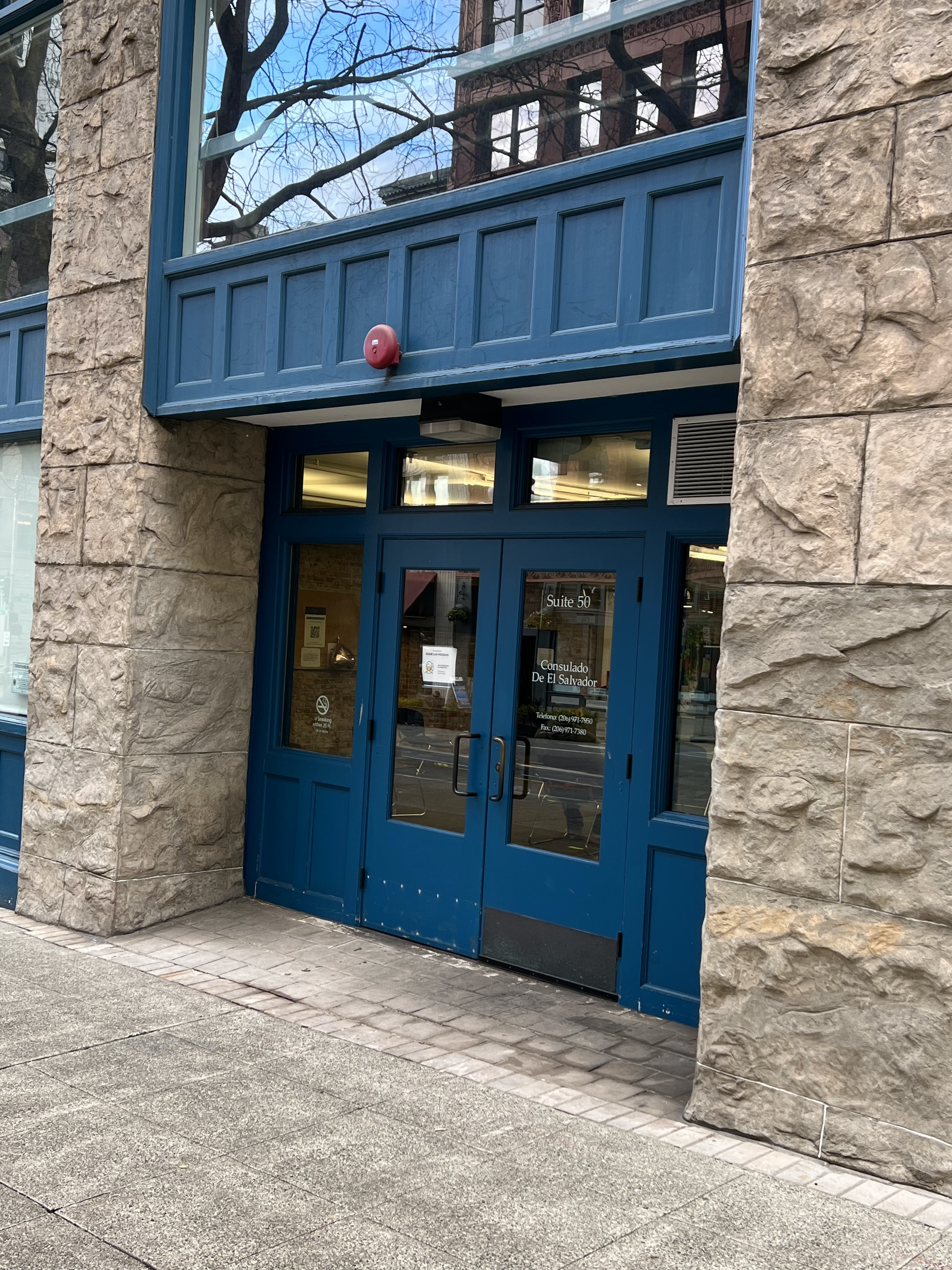
Consulate-General in Seattle

== Closed missions ==
- Republic of China (Taiwan)
  - Taipei (Embassy) (closed in 2018)

== Mission to open ==
- Egypt
  - Cairo (Embassy)

== See also ==
- Foreign relations of El Salvador
- List of diplomatic missions in El Salvador
- Visa policy of El Salvador
- Salvadoran passport
