= Visa policy of El Salvador =

Policy on permits required to enter El Salvador

Visitors to El Salvador must obtain a Special Entry Permit unless they are citizens from one of the visa-exempt countries.

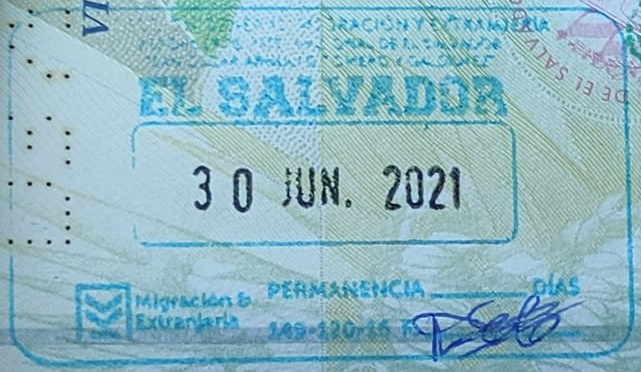
Entry and exit stamps.

All visitors must hold a passport valid for at least 6 months from the date of arrival.

== Visa policy map ==
Visa policy of El Salvador El Salvador Visa not required - may enter with an ID card (180 days) Visa not required (180 days) Visa not required (90 days) Visa not required (180 days) if holding a valid Canadian, Schengen or US visa; otherwise, Special Entry Permit required Special Entry Permit required

== Visa exemption ==
=== Ordinary passports ===
Citizens of the following countries and territories may enter El Salvador without a visa for stays up to the duration listed below. All visitors (except for citizens of Belize, Costa Rica, Guatemala, Honduras, Nicaragua and Panama) must hold proof of sufficient funds to cover their stay and documents required for next destination.

180 days

- All European Union member states

- Albania
- Andorra
- Antigua and Barbuda
- Argentina
- Australia
- Bahamas
- Bahrain
- Barbados
- Belize
- Brazil
- Brunei
- Canada
- Chile
- Colombia
- Costa Rica
- Dominican Republic
- Ecuador
- Fiji
- Guatemala^{ID}
- Honduras^{ID}
- Iceland
- Israel
- Japan
- Kuwait
- Liechtenstein
- Madagascar
- Malaysia
- Marshall Islands
- Mexico
- Monaco
- New Zealand
- Nicaragua^{ID}
- North Macedonia
- Norway
- Panama
- Paraguay
- Peru
- Qatar
- Russia
- Saint Kitts and Nevis
- Saint Lucia
- Saint Vincent and the Grenadines
- San Marino
- São Tomé and Príncipe
- Saudi Arabia
- Singapore
- Solomon Islands
- South Africa
- South Korea
- Switzerland
- Trinidad and Tobago
- Turkey
- Tuvalu
- Ukraine
- United Arab Emirates
- United Kingdom
- United States
- Uruguay
- Vanuatu
- Vatican City

90 days

- Bolivia

_{ID - May enter with an ID card if come from a country that is part of the CA-4 Agreement.}

Date of visa changes
- 25 February 1973: Japan
- 1 April 1985: France
- 23 March 1988: Argentina
- 14 February 1997: South Korea
- 13 December 2023: Peru
- 21 June 2024: Bolivia

Cancelled:

- 2 May 2008: Venezuela
- 12 December 2018: Taiwan

==== Substitute visa ====
Citizens of other countries who would normally require visas may enter El Salvador without a visa for up to 180 days if holding a valid visa issued by any Schengen Area member state, Canada or the United States.

However, this policy does not apply to citizens of the following countries and territories:

- Afghanistan
- Algeria
- Angola
- Armenia
- Bangladesh
- Bosnia and Herzegovina
- Botswana
- Cameroon
- Republic of the Congo
- DR Congo
- Eritrea
- Ethiopia
- Ghana
- Haiti
- Indonesia
- Iran
- Iraq
- Jordan
- Kenya
- Laos
- Lebanon
- Liberia
- Libya
- Mali
- Mongolia
- Mozambique
- Nepal
- Nigeria
- North Korea
- Oman
- Pakistan
- Palestine
- Sierra Leone
- Somalia
- Sri Lanka
- Sudan
- Syria
- Taiwan
- Timor-Leste
- Vietnam
- Yemen

=== Non-ordinary passports ===
In addition to countries whose citizens are visa-exempt, holders of diplomatic or official / service passports of Belarus, Bolivia, Cuba, Dominica, Dominican Republic, Egypt, Grenada, Guyana, Haiti, Indonesia, Jamaica, Jordan, Kenya, Montenegro, Morocco, Pakistan, Papua New Guinea, Peru, Philippines, Serbia, Suriname, Thailand, Venezuela and Vietnam may enter El Salvador without a visa.

=== Future changes ===
El Salvador has signed visa exemption agreements with the following countries, but they have not yet been ratified:

Country	Passports	Agreement signed on
Kuwait	Diplomatic, official, special	26 September 2026

== Special Entry Permit (PEI) ==
Citizens of other countries may obtain a Special Entry Permit without having to apply to a consulate for a visa.

== Airport Improvement Tariff ==
Citizens of Angola, Algeria, Benin, Botswana, Burkina Faso, Burundi, Cape Verde, Cameroon, Central African Republic, Comoros, Republic of the Congo, Democratic Republic of the Congo, Chad, Djibouti, Egypt, Eritrea, Eswatini, Ethiopia, Equatorial Guinea, Gabon, Gambia, Ghana, Guinea, Guinea Bissau, India, Ivory Coast, Kenya, Lesotho, Liberia, Libya, Madagascar, Malawi, Mali, Mauritius, Mauritania, Morocco, Mozambique, Namibia, Niger, Nigeria, Rwanda, São Tomé and Príncipe, Senegal, Seychelles, Sierra Leone, Somalia, South Africa, South Sudan, Sudan, Tanzania, Togo, Tunisia, Uganda, Western Sahara, Zambia and Zimbabwe are required to pay an airport improvement tax of USD1,130.00 (USD1,000.00 + 13% VAT) for transit through San Oscar Arnulfo Romero and Galdámez Airport.

== Central America-4 Border Control Agreement ==
The Central America-4 Border Control Agreement is a treaty between Guatemala, El Salvador, Honduras and Nicaragua. A visa issued by one of the four countries is honored by all four of the countries. The time period for the visa, however, applies to the total time spent in any of the four countries without leaving the CA-4 area.

== Transit ==
Transit without a visa is allowed for travelers who normally require a visa but are transiting within 96 hours and hold onward tickets.

== Visitor statistics ==
Most visitors arriving in El Salvador for the purpose of tourism (excluding those on a one-day visit) were from the following countries of nationality:

Country	2015	2014	2013
Guatemala	530,531	511,829	465,055
United States	447,628	431,792	422,811
Honduras	202,339	177,777	171,763
Mexico	32,654	27,567	27,489
Costa Rica	28,737	27,981	25,150
Nicaragua	28,262	33,931	32,937
Canada	24,796	29,188	31,911
Spain	8,565	7,850	7,788
Germany	3,532	4,123	5,440
Total	1,401,598	1,345,165	1,282,792

== See also ==
- Central America-4 Border Control Agreement
- Visa requirements for El Salvador citizens
