= Korean passport =

Korean passport may refer to:

- South Korean passport, issued by the Republic of Korea
- North Korean passport, issued by the Democratic People's Republic of Korea
- Korean Empire passport, issued by the former Korean Empire in the early 20th century
