= Korean visa policy =

Korean visa policy may refer to:

- Visa policy of South Korea
- Visa policy of North Korea

== See also ==
- Visa requirements for South Korean citizens
- Visa requirements for North Korean citizens
