= North Korean identity card =

Citizen's ID Card
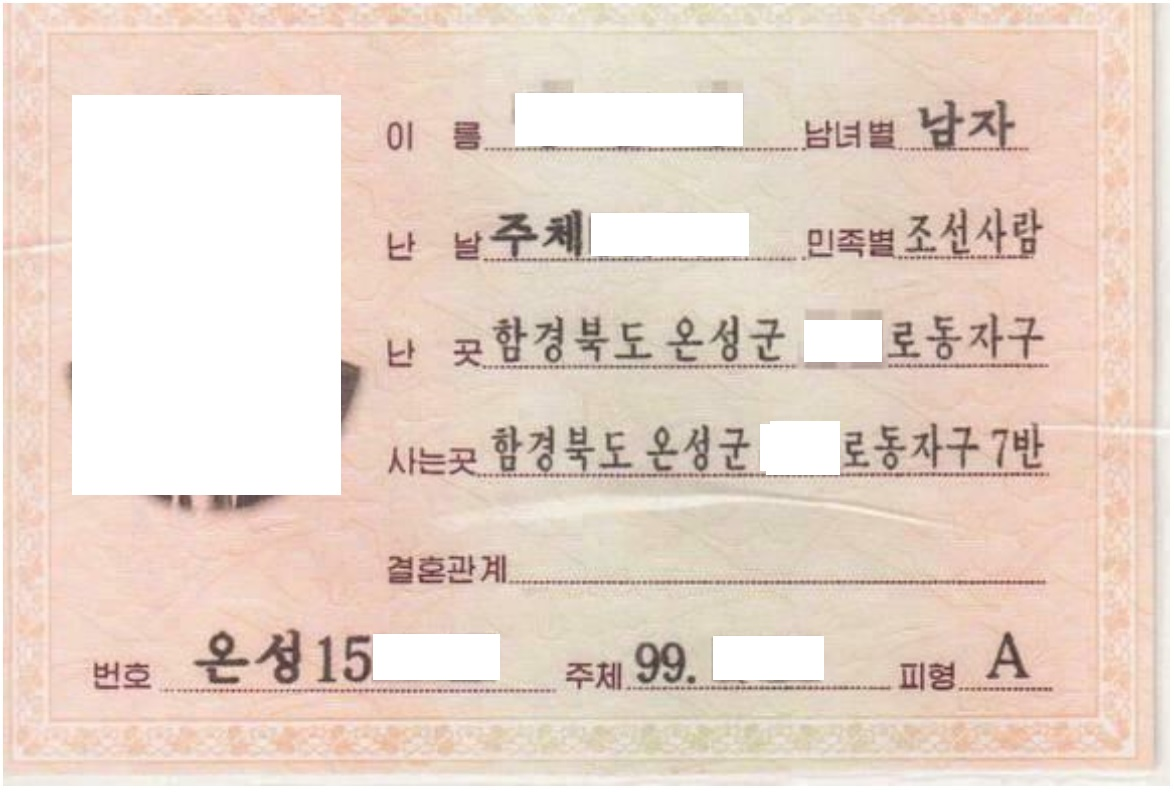
- North Korean ID issued in 2004
- Type: Identity document
- Issued by: Ministry of Social Security
- Purpose: Proof of identification for all citizens
- Eligibility: 17+ ages; North Korean citizenship
- Cost: Free of charge

In the Democratic People's Republic of Korea, a citizen's ID card (Korean: 공민증; read as Gongminjeung and translated as Citizen's Identity Card or Citizen's Certificate) is the main identity card. When citizens of North Korea become 17 years old, they must register their residence at the social security office in the area where they live. The residence registration application form must state their name, gender, date of birth, place of birth, and residence. Citizens over the age of 17 are given citizen's ID cards, and citizens over the age of 17 who reside in Pyongyang are also given a Pyongyang citizen's ID card (평양시민증).

In the past, the identity documents were a transparent plastic film pressed after the photo identification was posted on a slightly thicker paper. From around 2016 the current form of identity card entered into use. It is 8cm long and 5.5cm wide, which is smaller than the older version, and the color has also changed. However, the new document is in the form of a hard plastic card.

== See also ==
- North Korean passport
- Citizenship in North Korea
- Nationality Law of the Democratic People's Republic of Korea
