= South Korean passport =

Passport issued to South Korean citizens

Republic of Korea passport 대한민국 여권
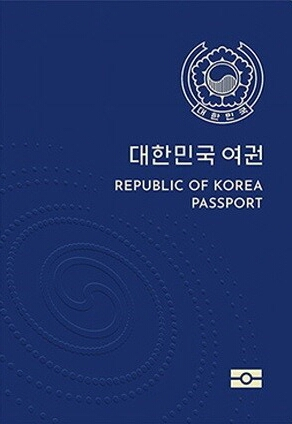
- The front cover of a contemporary Republic of Korea (from 21 December 2021) biometric passport (with chip)

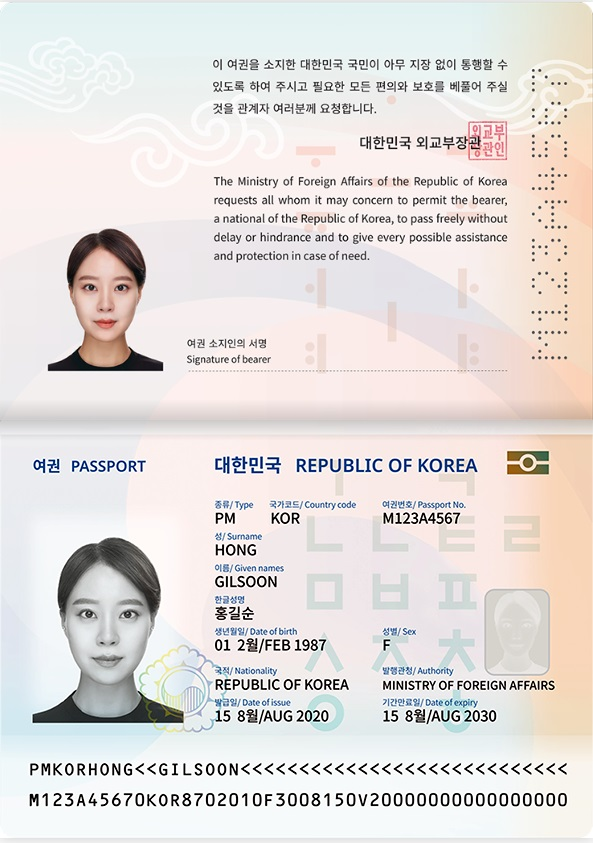
- Identity Information Page of a South Korean biometric Passport (post-21 December 2021)
- Type: Passport
- Issued by: Ministry of Foreign Affairs
- First issued: 1948 (first version); 25 August 2008 (biometric passport); 20 April 2017; (passport with braille added for blind people) (Note: But sometimes passport scan error occurs because of braille. So now braille is added only if requested.); 21 December 2021 (current version)
- Purpose: Identification
- Valid in: Worldwide excluding the DPRK
- Eligibility: South Korean citizenship
- Expiration: 10 years (18 years old and older); 5 years (under 18)
- Cost: KRW 47,000 (26 pages); KRW 50,000 (58 pages)

- South Korean passport
- Hangul: 대한민국 여권
- Hanja: 大韓民國旅券
- RR: Daehanminguk yeogwon
- MR: Taehanmin'guk yŏkwŏn

The Republic of Korea passport (Korean: 대한민국 여권), commonly known as the South Korean passport, are travel documents issued to South Korean citizens to facilitate their international travel. Like any other passport, South Korean passports serve as proof for passport holders' personal information, such as nationality and date of birth.

South Korean passports are issued by the Ministry of Foreign Affairs and delegated to provincial governments and municipalities. Korean passports have been printed by the Korea Minting and Security Printing Corporation (KOMSCO) since 1973. On 21 December 2021, issuing of the next generation biometric passports to South Korean citizens begun, which was delayed by a year due to the COVID-19 pandemic.

== Types ==
- Ordinary passport: Issued to ordinary citizens. Ordinary passports are issued for one, five, or ten years, depending on the age of the bearer (see below for details).
- Diplomatic passport: Issued to the President, Prime Minister, Minister and Parliamentary Secretaries, Permanent Secretaries of Foreign Affairs of Korea, military attaché of Korean Armed Forces, diplomats and citizens who serve under diplomatic terms. These passports guarantee special treatment in other countries.
- Official passport: Issued to members of the Parliament of Korea, members of provincial legislatures and civil servants of the Government of Korea, provincial governments and local municipalities during his or her term. Also military personnel of the Korean Armed Forces, except military attaché, also possess the official passport.
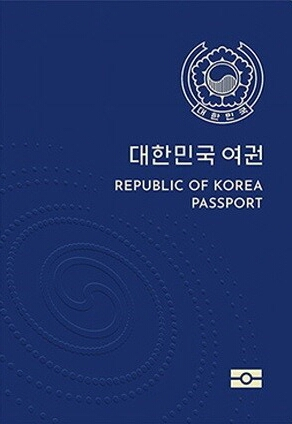
Ordinary passport

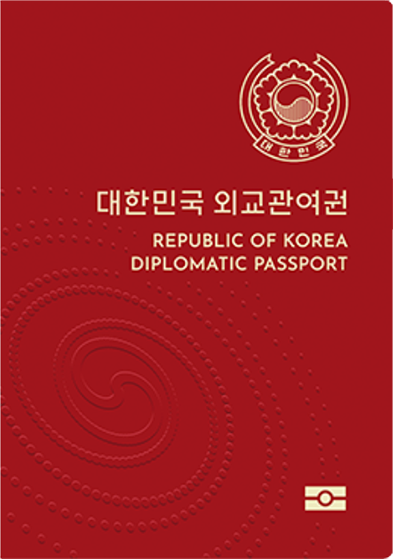
Diplomatic passport

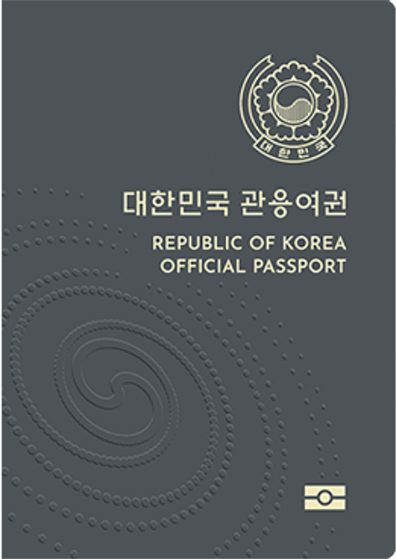
Official passport

== Expiration and cost ==
Type	Multiple/Single	Validity	Number of Pages	Cost
Biometric	Multiple	10 Years (18 or above)	58	KRW 52,000
Biometric	Multiple	10 Years (18 or above)	26	KRW 49,000
Biometric	Multiple	5 Years (under 18)	58	KRW 44,000 (KRW 35,000 for under 8)
Biometric	Multiple	5 Years (under 18)	26	KRW 41,000 (KRW 32,000 for under 8)
Biometric	Multiple	Below 5 Years (Note: For the first time in 60 years since the introduction of the conscription system, the restrictions on the validity period of multiple-entry passports for those who have not completed their military service have been abolished. Now, regardless of military service status, all adults aged 18 and older are issued 10-year multiple-entry passports. Even individuals who have not fulfilled their military service can now travel abroad by simply stating an oath to complete their service upon returning, instead of requiring prior approval. Passports with a validity of 5 years are issued only to minors or those listed as habitual passport losers.).) (Note: If a person who stated an oath to complete his service renounce South Korean citizenship without completing military service by obtaining foreign citizenship, re-obtaining South Korean citizenship will not be allowed and not even be eligible for applying returning resident visa (F-2 status, 재외동포 비자) until the age of 40, which is the age limit of being conscripted during the wartime, as disadvantage for the perjury. This disadvantage does not apply for persons who renounced South Korean citizenship before making oath, including those who obtained foreign citizenship by birth or before turning 18 or those who gain foreign citizenship involuntarily, that generally not required to renounce foreign citizenship or South Korean citizenship.) (Note: Persons who emigrated before turning 19 are deferred from military duty until 35, and waivered from military service at the age of 35, which is the age limit of military service during non-wartime.)	26	KRW 15,000
Biometric	Single	Below 1 Year	14	KRW 20,000
Non-Biometric Emergency Passport (Note: Only issued in case of emergency.)	Single	Below 1 Year	14	KRW 53,000
Non-Biometric Emergency Passport	Single	Below 1 Year	14	KRW 20,000 (Note: For those who provide documents of a family member's death or who is in a critical condition.)
Non-biometric Travel Document (Note: Issued to: 1) Stateless persons, 2) Refugees, 3)Korean nationals who are living in Japan as Special permanent resident of Japan (Tokubetsu Eijyusha) and did not registered for South Korean citizenship( non-citizen Korean nationals), and 4) Foreign nationals who are not able to obtain passport from their country of citizenship.)	Single or Multiple	Varies depending on situation	14	KRW 23,000

- KRW 25,000 for a new passport with the same date of expiry as one's previous passport.
- KRW 5,000 to change details on one's old passport.
- KRW 5,500 to charge Post Service

== Physical appearance ==
South Korean ordinary passports are dark blue, with the National Emblem of the Republic of Korea emblazoned in gold in the top right of the front cover. The words "대한민국 여권" (Korean) and "REPUBLIC OF KOREA PASSPORT" (English) are inscribed below the Emblem, whereas the international e-passport symbol is inscribed on the bottom right of the front cover. Lastly, the stylized Taegeuk pattern with dotted circles is embossed on the left side of the front cover.

=== Identity Information Page ===
- Photo of the passport holder
- Type (PM or PR or PS): PM passports can be used for multiple entries, while PS passports are valid for a single entry. PR passports are for Koreans who are permanent residents of countries other than Korea. However, the PR type passport has been abolished as of 21 December 2017, and permanent residents of other countries now receive an ordinary passport.
- Issuing country code: KOR
- Passport number: Includes a total of nine digits; in passports issued from 25 August 2008 onward, the passport number will retain the same 9 digits, but the Issued Local code will be changed to a single letter 'M' denoting PM passports and 'S' for PS passports. The remaining 8 digits will be the serial number.
- Surname: Passports from other nations such as Bulgaria and Greece have the bearer's name written in the local script alongside the Latin alphabet. However, in the South Korean passport, only the Latin alphabet is permitted for use in the surname and given name sections. Their local script name is written in the separate hangul name section.
- Given names
- Hangul name
- Date of birth
- Sex
- Nationality: Republic of Korea
- Issuing authority: Ministry of Foreign Affairs
- Date of issue
- Date of expiry

==== Information removed from new passports since 21 December 2021 ====
- Personal ID number (Resident registration number of South Korea): Prior to 2015, South Korean passports issued to Zainichi Koreans did not have resident registration numbers, reflecting their statutory exemption from taxation and conscription in South Korea (Conversely, Zainichi Koreans were not allowed to vote. However, from 2012, all Korean passport holders are eligible to vote, and in 2015, Zainichi Koreans were allowed to obtain a resident registration number regardless of their statutory exemptions).

=== Passport photo requirements ===
A photo for a Korean passport should meet specific requirements:

- Size: 35mm by 45mm with 300 DPI
- Head size and position: From chin to forehead should be 32mm to 36mm.
- Photo must be in colour.
- Must be taken in the last 6 months.
- Background: Solid white only. No other objects visible, like door, windows etc.
- Neutral face expression.
- 2 passport photos per application.
- Head cover is allowed for religious or medical reasons.

=== Passport message ===
The message inside South Korean passports are written in both Korean and English. The message in the passport, nominally from the South Korean Minister of Foreign Affairs, states:

In Korean:

이 여권을 소지한 대한민국 국민이 아무 지장 없이 통행할 수 있도록 하여 주시고 필요한 모든 편의와 보호를 베풀어 주실 것을 관계자 여러분께 요청합니다.

In English:

The Ministry of Foreign Affairs of the Republic of Korea requests all whom it may concern to permit the bearer, a national of the Republic of Korea, to pass freely without delay or hindrance and to provide every possible assistance and protection in case of need.

=== Languages ===
The textual portions of passports are printed in both English and Korean.

== Biometric passport ==
The South Korean government has been issuing biometric passports since February 2008 for diplomats and government officials, and for the general population since 24 August 2008.

The South Korean Ministry of Foreign Affairs formed the "Committee for Promoting e-Passports" in April 2006, which scheduled to issue biometric passports during the second half of 2008. On 4 September 2007, media reports indicated that the South Korean government had decided to revise its passport law to issue biometric passports which included fingerprint information: First to diplomats during the first quarter of 2008, and to the general public during the second half of the year. Some civil groups have protested the fingerprinting requirement as excessive as the ICAO only requires a photograph to be recorded on the biometric chip.

On 26 February 2008, the Parliament of Korea passed a revision of the passport law. A new biometric passport was issued to diplomats in March, and to the general public shortly thereafter. Fingerprinting measures would not be implemented immediately; however, they began on 1 January 2010.

The appearance of the new biometric passports is almost identical to the former machine-readable versions, and they both have 48 pages. However, the space for visas was reduced by six pages. These pages are now reserved for identification purposes, notices and other information, as well as the bearer's contacts. In the new biometric passports, the main identification page has moved to the second page from inside the front cover. The note from the Foreign Affairs Minister is still shown on the front page and the signature is shown on the page after photo identification.

The new biometric passport incorporates many security features such as colour shifting ink, hologram, ghost image, infrared ink, intaglio, laser perforation of the passport number (from the third page to the back cover), latent image, microprinting, security thread, solvent sensitive ink, and steganography.

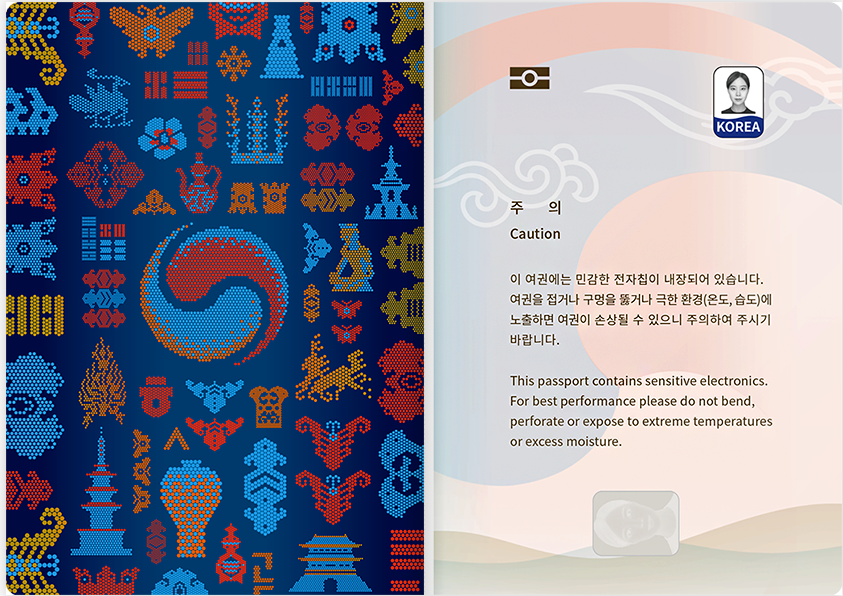
A caution page for the biometric chip

Inside the first page, a caution for the biometric chip is written both in Korean,

주의
이 여권에는 민감한 전자 칩이 내장되어 있습니다. 여권을 접거나 구멍을 뚫거나 극한 환경(온도,습도)에 노출하면 여권이 손상될 수 있으니 주의하여 주시기 바랍니다.

and in English,

Caution
This passport contains sensitive electronics, For best performance please do not bend, perforate or expose to extreme temperatures or excess moisture.

The passport holders' contact information that was originally held inside the back cover has also been moved to the last page of the new passport.

== New passports issued from 2021 ==
From 21 December 2021, the Ministry of Foreign Affairs issued a new biometric passport. The passport was redesigned with improvements in security. The identification page is made of polycarbonate to make it harder to forge. The colour of the cover of the ordinary passport was changed from green to navy blue. The bearer's personal ID number (Resident registration number of South Korea) was removed for greater security. The new passport was originally intended to be issued from June 2020 for diplomatic and official passports holders and December 2020 for those holding an ordinary passport. However, due to the COVID-19 pandemic, the number of traveling citizens declined resulting in the delay of the new passport's introduction until late 2021 or whenever the current passport booklet stock was depleted. Diplomatic and officials passports were issued as planned.

== Visa requirements map ==
Visa requirements for South Korean citizens South Korea Visit Certificate from the Ministry of Unification required Visa not required / ESTA / eTA / eVisitor Visa on arrival eVisa Visa available both on arrival or online Visa required

Visa requirements for South Korean citizens are administrative entry restrictions by the authorities of other states placed on citizens of Republic of Korea. As of April 2025, South Korean citizens had visa-free or visa on arrival access to 190 countries and territories, tied with the Japanese passport as the second most powerful passport in the world in terms of travel freedom, according to the Henley Passport Index.

Additionally, Arton Capital's Passport Index ranked the South Korean passport fourth in the world in terms of travel freedom, with a visa-free score of 174, tied with the Swedish, Polish and Hungarian passports, as of April 2025.

== Inter-Korean travel ==
The South Korean (Republic of Korea) constitution considers North Korea (Democratic People's Republic of Korea) as part of its territory, although under a different administration. In other words, the South does not view going to and from the North as breaking the continuity of a person's stay, as long as the traveler does not land on third country, i.e. non-Korean, territory.

However, because of the political situation between the South and the isolated socialist Juche government of North Korea, it is almost impossible to enter the North from the South across the Korean DMZ (exiting South Korea via the northern border). Tourists wishing to enter North Korea have to pass through another country, and most enter from China, because most flights to/from Pyongyang serve Beijing.

South Koreans are generally not allowed to visit North Korea, except with special authorizations granted by the Ministry of Unification and North Korean authorities on a limited basis (e.g. workers and businessmen visiting or commuting to/from Kaesong Industrial Complex). South Koreans who are allowed to visit North Korea are issued a North Korean visa on a separate sheet of paper, not in the South Korean passport. The Republic of Korea passport can be used to enter North Korea, because passport is one of the government's approved identity documents, but it is being only to prove the bearer's identity, not to determine the bearer's legal residence. South Koreans can also use other government approved identity documents such as National ID Card and Driver's License, because the South Korean government treats North Korea as part of South Korea and expects South Korean IDs to be accepted.

In 1998, visa-free travel to the tourist resort of Mount Kumgang and the Kaesong Industrial Region was made possible under the "sunshine policy" orchestrated by South Korean President Kim Dae-jung. Those wishing to travel across the DMZ were given special travel certificates issued by the Ministry of Unification through Hyundai Asan. In July 2008, a female tourist named Park Wang-ja was shot and killed by a North Korean guard on a beach near Mount Kumgang, which led to the suspension of the tours. As of March 2010 all travel across the DMZ was suspended due to increasing tensions between North and South Korea. In 2018, Kim Jong-un went to South Korea through the DMZ and met up with South Korean officials. They discussed reunification.

There are four land border checkpoints in South Korea for inter-Korea travel.

== Restricted nations ==
The South Korean government has banned citizens from traveling to Afghanistan, Iraq, Libya, Somalia, Syria and Yemen for safety reasons. Due to the Russian invasion of Ukraine, South Koreans are banned from travelling to Ukraine.

As a result of the Sudanese civil war, Korean citizens are banned from travelling there, effective April 28, 2023.

On 1 May 2024, due to safety concerns about the Haitian conflict, the South Korean government announced a travel ban to Haiti.

On 4 November 2025, due to safety concerns and threats by Al-Qaeda in the country, the South Korean government imposed a ban on its citizens traveling to Mali.

== Gallery of South Korean passports ==
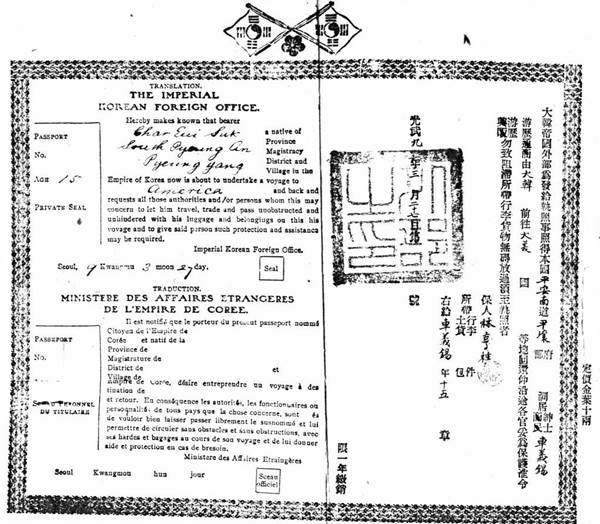
A Korean Empire travel passport issued in 1905

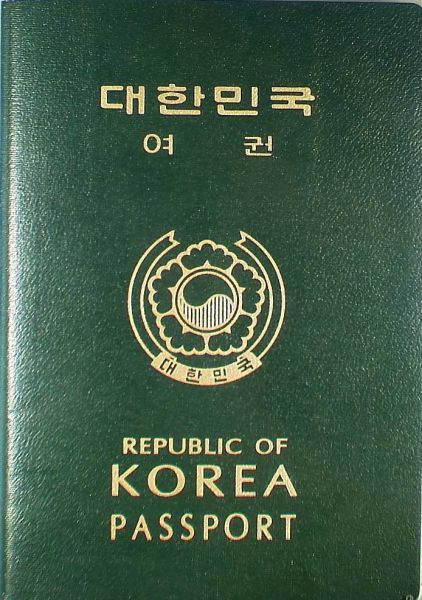
A machine-readable Republic of Korea passport issued in 1994

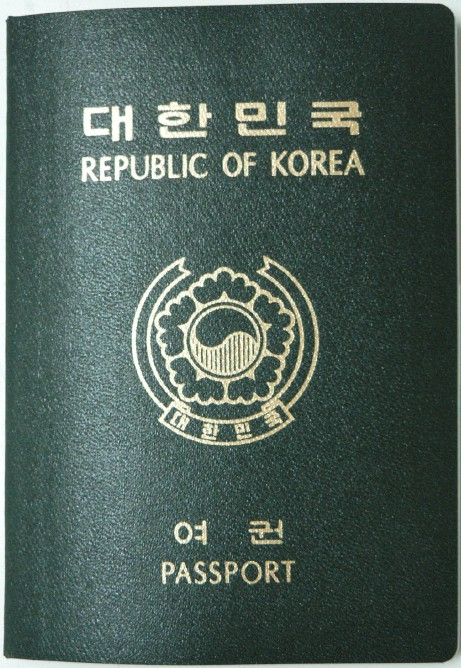
A machine-readable, non-biometric Republic of Korea passport issued in 2005

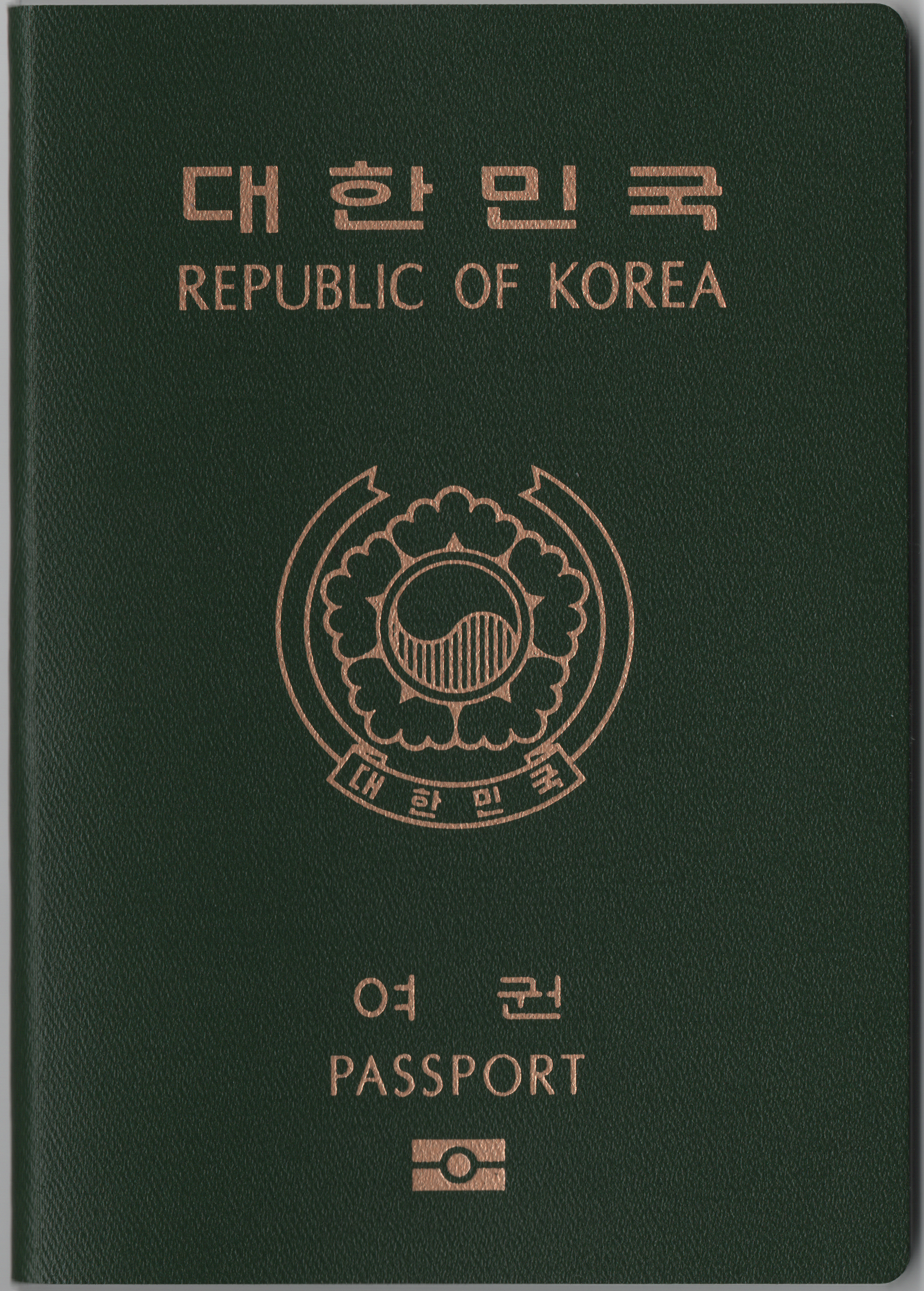
A biometric Republic of Korea passport issued between 25 August 2008 and 20 December 2021

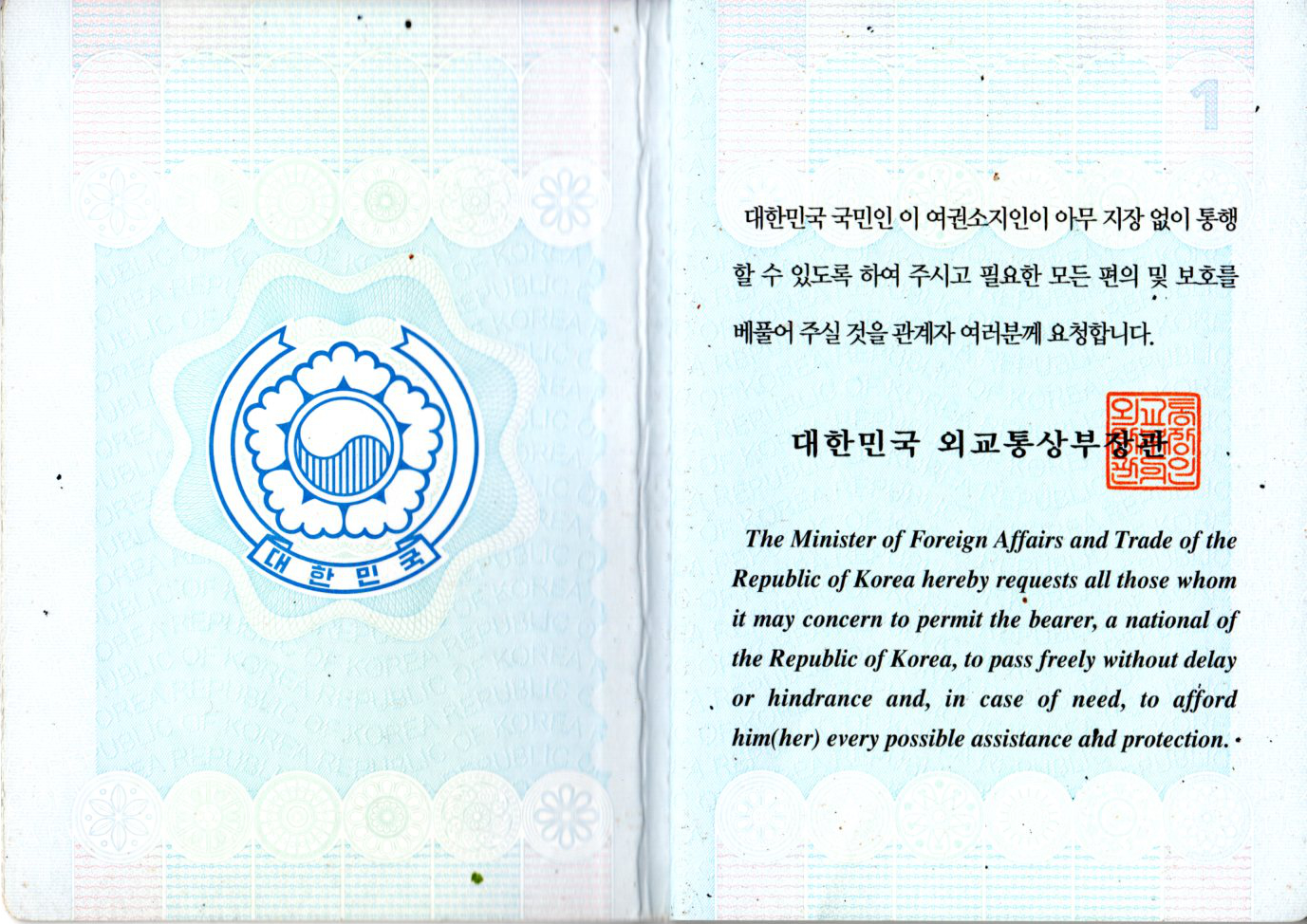
2011 a message from South Korean Minister of Foreign Affairs

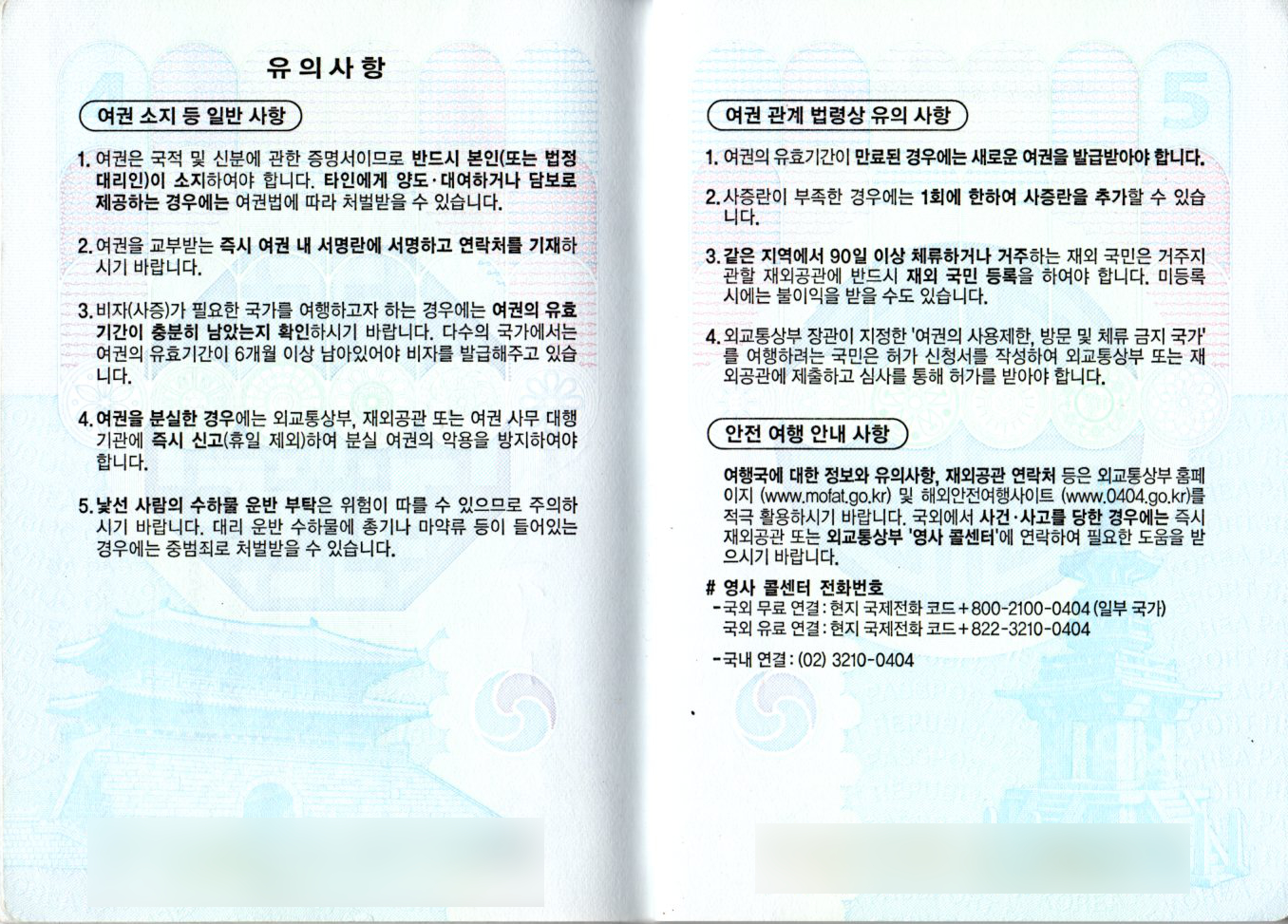
2011 Passport note

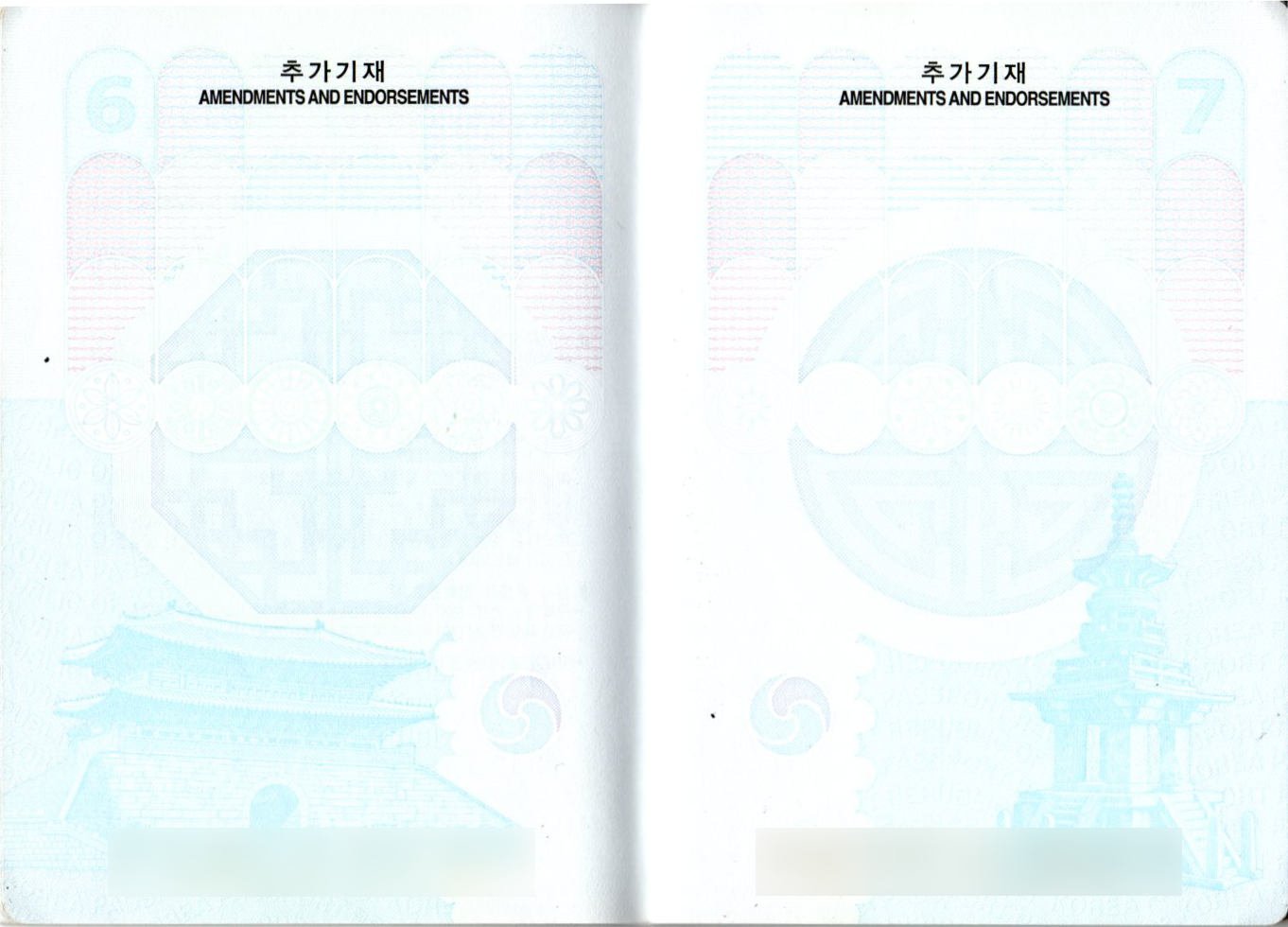
2011 Amendments and Endorsements

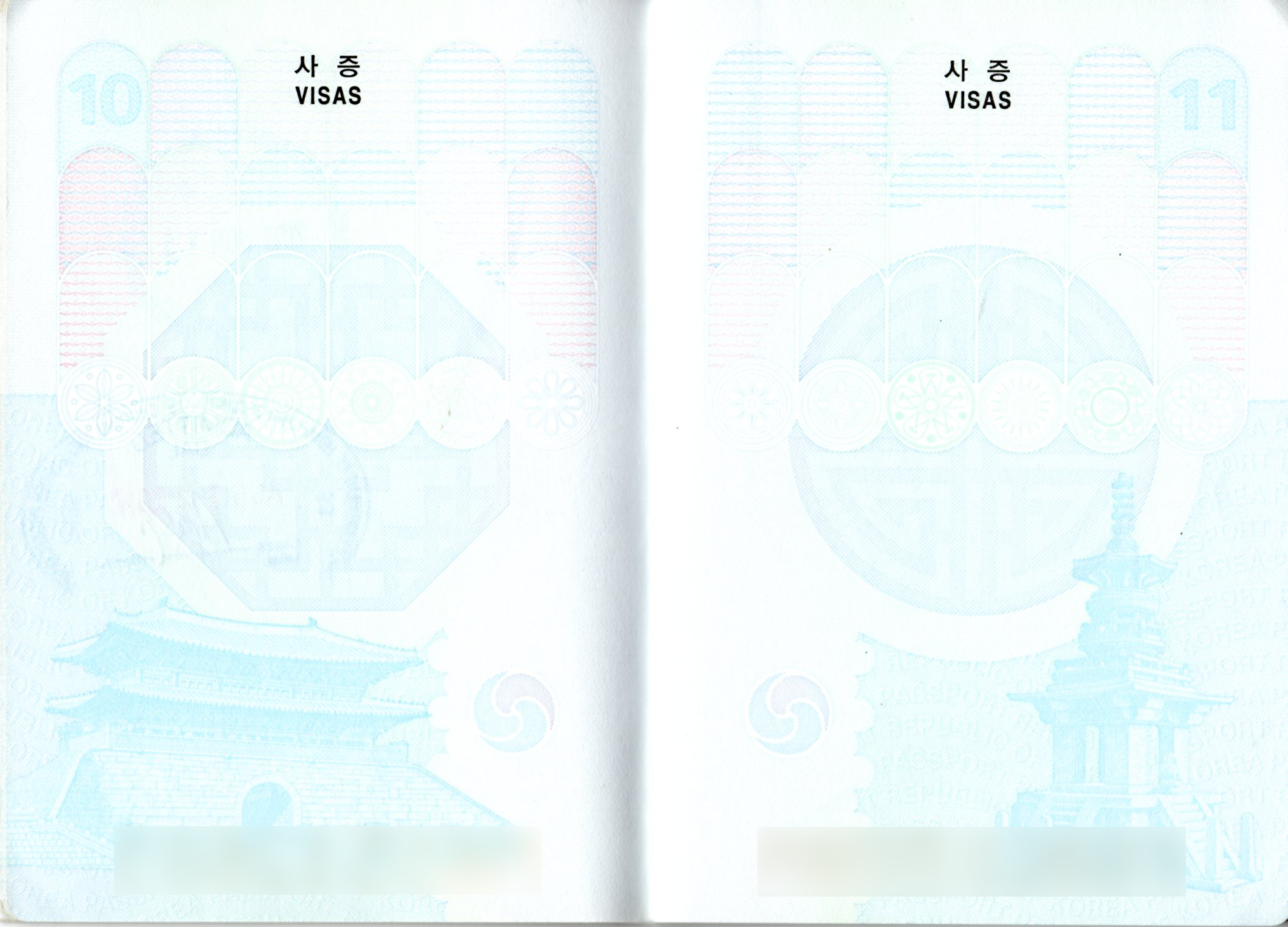
2011 An empty stamp visas page 10 and 11

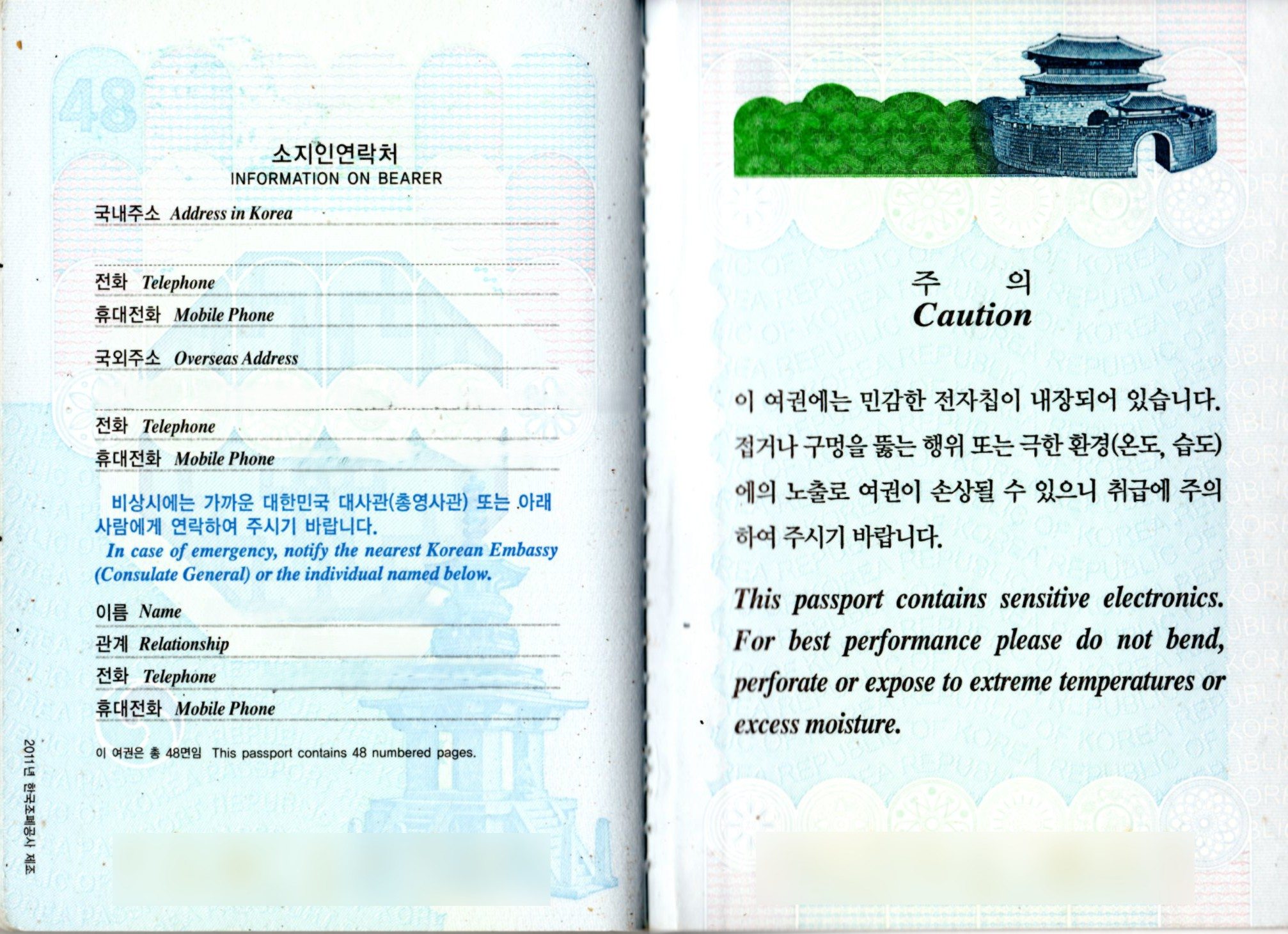
On page 48, a contact fill information

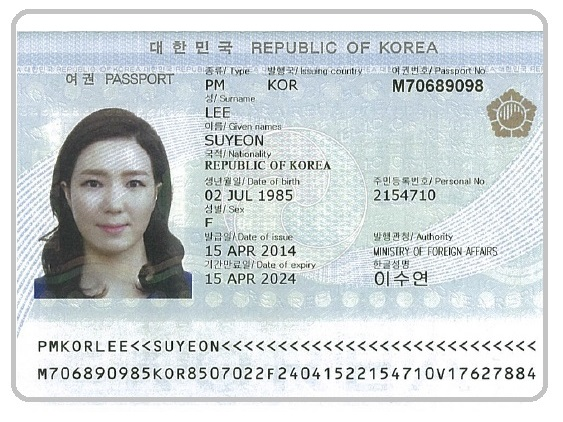
Specimen of the identity information page of Republic of Korea biometric passport issued until 20 December 2021

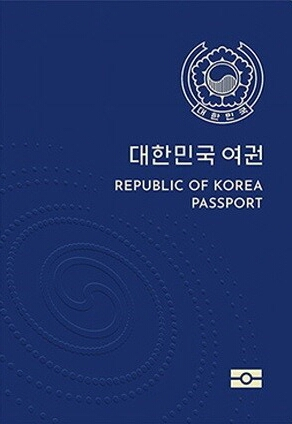
A current version of the biometric Republic of Korea passport issued from 21 December 2021

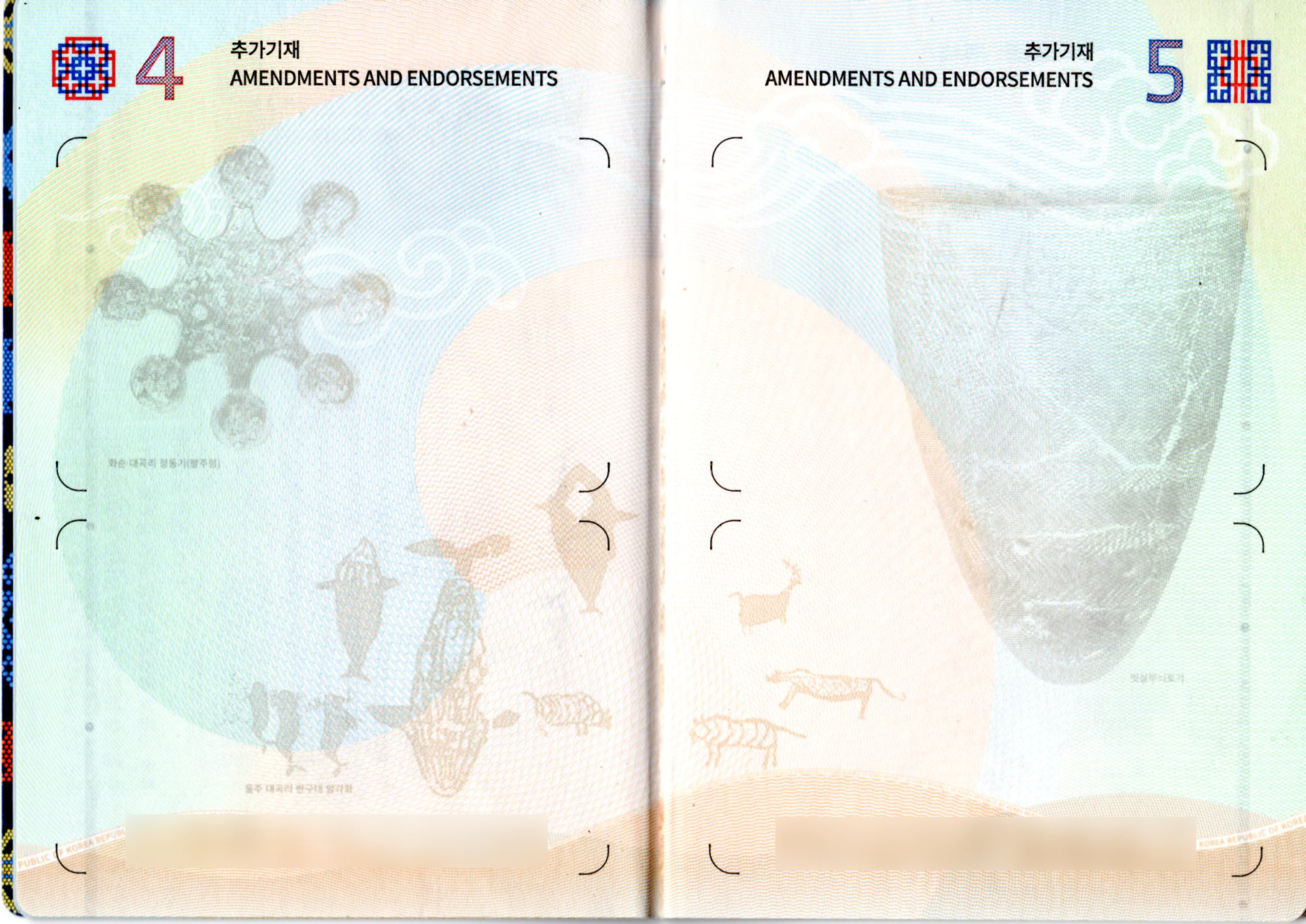
An empty Amendments and Endorsements in 2024

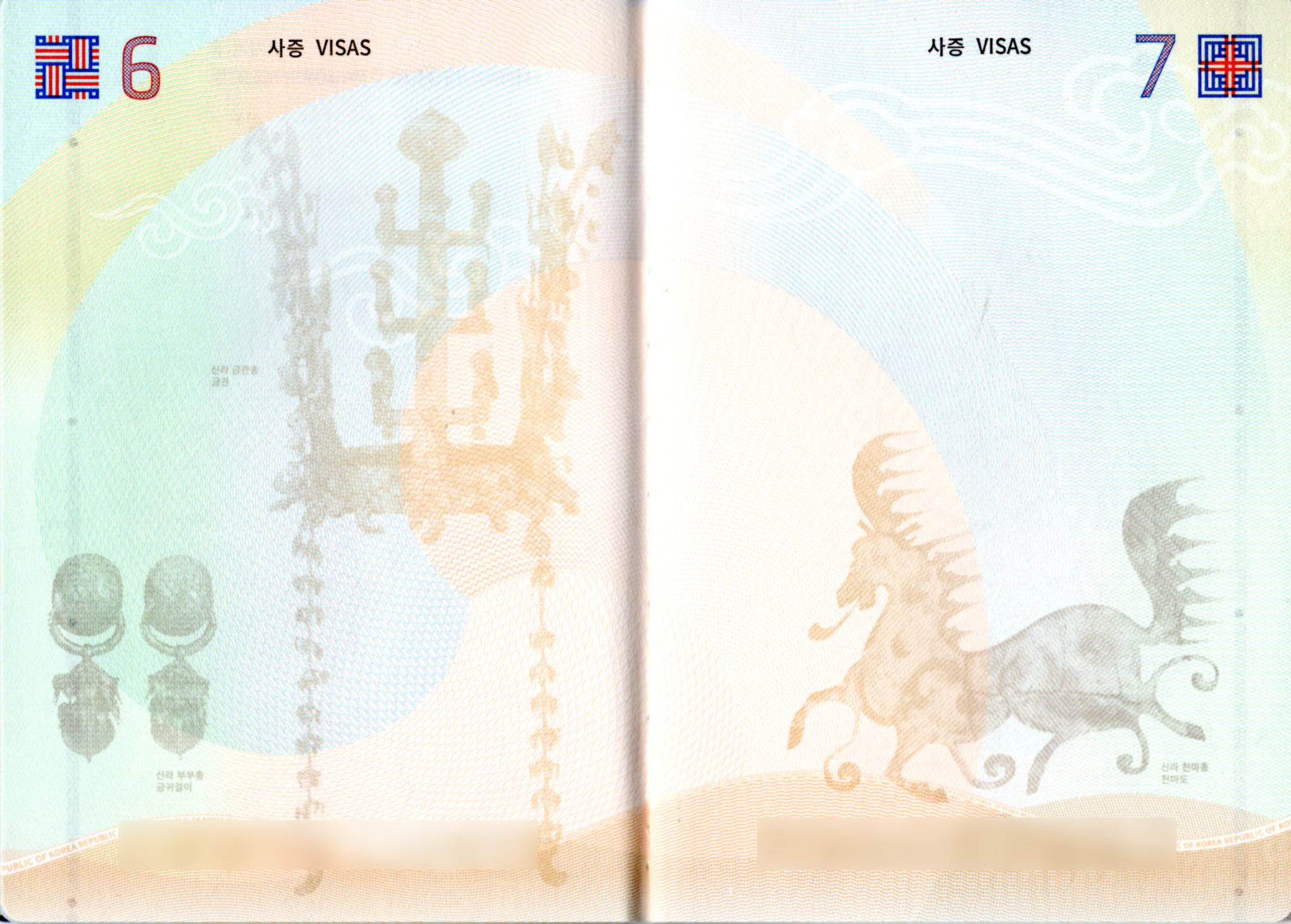
2025 An empty visas stamp

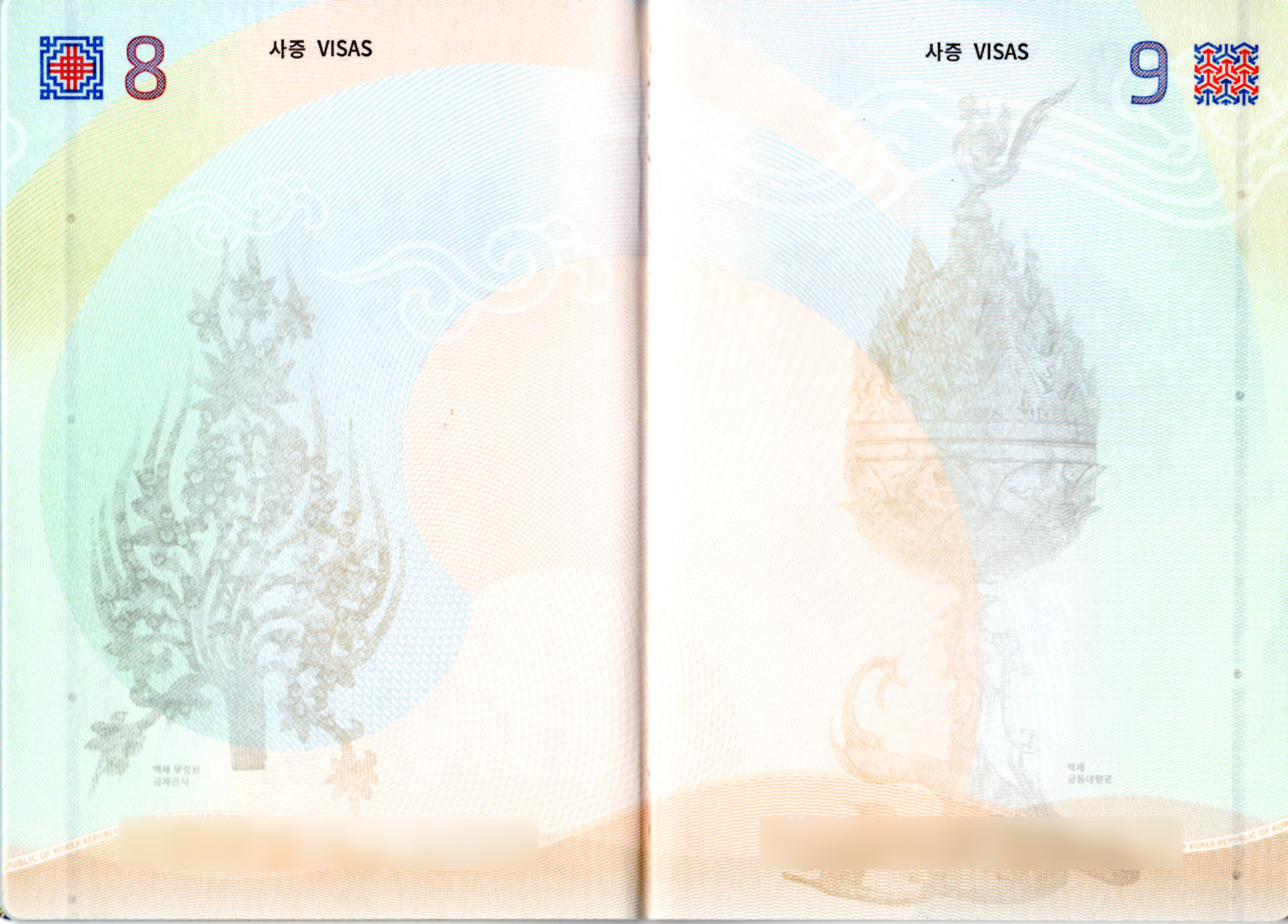
2024 Passport page next show art.

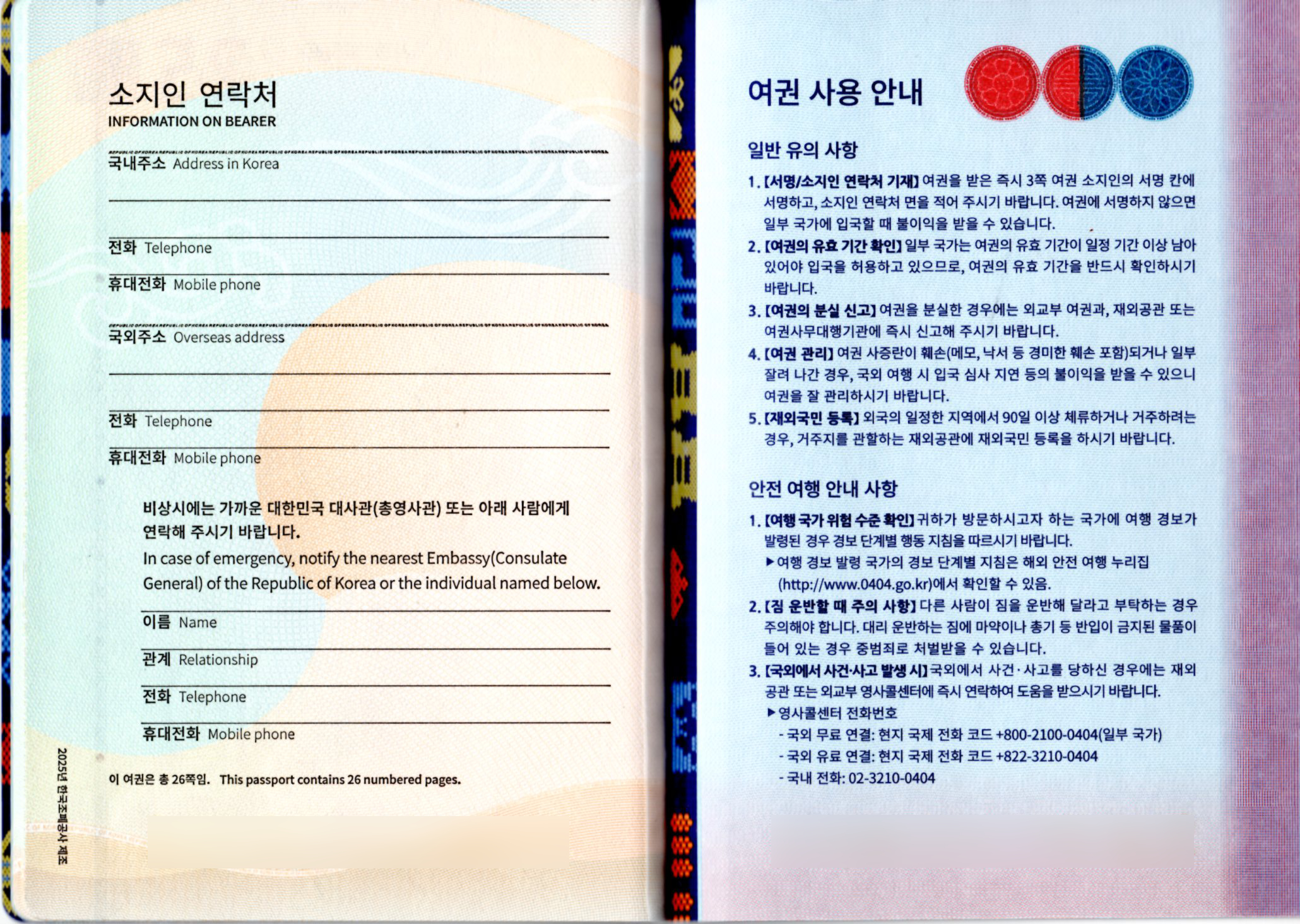
A contact information on the left. A passport usage information on the right, Manufactured 2025

== See also ==
- Biometric passports
- List of passports
- Visa Waiver Program
- Visa policy of South Korea
- South Korean nationality law
- Visa requirements for South Korean citizens
- Korean Empire passport
- North Korean passport
