= Visa policy of North Korea =

Policy on permits required to enter North Korea

Visitors to North Korea must obtain a visa from one of the North Korean diplomatic missions.

All visitors holding ordinary passports (except South Korea) must obtain a visa prior to entering North Korea. For tourism purposes require prior authorization from a travel agency registered with the State General Bureau of Tourist Guidance.

== Visa policy map ==
Visa policy of North Korea The Democratic People's Republic of Korea Visa required Admission restricted

== Visa exemption ==
Since 2014, citizens of China holding ordinary passports visiting only the Tongrim County in a tour group can stay there for up to 2 days. They may also visit Sinuiju for a day trip without a visa.

Date of visa changes
- Kyrgyzstan: Under the agreement between USSR and North Korea on 22 January 1986
- 9 March 2009: Malaysia
- December 2013: Singapore

Cancelled:

- 1 October 2016: Singapore
- 6 March 2017: Malaysia

=== Non-ordinary passports ===
Visa policy of the Democratic People's Republic of Korea The Democratic People's Republic of Korea Visa not required for diplomatic, official or service category passports Visa not required for diplomatic passports Visa required

Holders of non-ordinary passports issued to citizens of the following countries can enter North Korea without a visa, for a stay up to the duration listed below:

Indefinite stay

- Kyrgyzstan^{D} ^{S}

90 days

- Belarus^{D} ^{O}
- Bulgaria^{D} ^{S}
- Mongolia^{D} ^{O}
- Russia^{D} ^{S}
- Serbia^{D} ^{O}

30 days

- Cambodia^{D O}
- China^{D S}
- Cuba^{D O}
- Iran^{D}
- Laos^{D} ^{S}
- Montenegro^{D} ^{S}
- Myanmar^{D} ^{S}
- Singapore^{D} ^{O}
- Tajikistan^{D} ^{S}
- Vietnam^{D} ^{O}
- Zimbabwe^{D} ^{O}

14 days

- Indonesia^{D S}

_{D - Diplomatic passports}
_{O - Official passports}
_{S - Service passports}

== Visa requirement ==
North Korean tourist visas are issued in the form of a tourist card for tourists, or on a separate paper for other types of visas. No stamps are stamped inside one's actual passport.

== South Korea ==
Citizens of South Korea seeking to visit North Korea cannot use South Korean passports to travel to North Korea. They must instead submit a North/South Korea visitation verification certificate or special authorization as well as a departure card to the North Korean immigration officer at the port of entry and go through immigration inspection in North Korea. No South Korean citizens have legally travelled to North Korea since 2021.

== Visitor statistics ==
Most visitors arriving in North Korea were from the following countries of nationality:

| Country | 2025 | 2024 | 2021 | 2020 | 2019 | 2018 | 2017 | 2016 | 2015 | 2014 | 2013 | 2012 | 2011 | 2010 |
|---|---|---|---|---|---|---|---|---|---|---|---|---|---|---|
| Russia | ▲9,985 | ▲6,469 | ▼89 | ▼437 | ▲3,134 | ▼2,995 | ▲4,359 | ▼4,220 | ▲4,231 | ▼3,819 | ▼6,313 | ▼6,636 | ▲8,314 | 4,625 |
| South Korea | 0 | 0 | ▼0 | ▼297 | ▼5,069 | ▼9,509 | ▲52 | ▼14,787 | ▼132,097 | ▲129,028 | ▲76,503 | ▼120,360 | ▼116,047 | 130,119 |

== See also ==
- Citizenship in North Korea
- North Korean passport
- Nationality Law of the Democratic People's Republic of Korea
- Visa requirements for North Korean citizens
- Tourism in North Korea
- Visa policy of South Korea
