= Visa requirements for North Korean citizens =

Travel allowances and restrictions

Visa requirements for North Korean citizens are administrative entry restrictions imposed on citizens of North Korea by the authorities of other states.

As of 2026, North Korean citizens have visa-free or visa on arrival access to 35 countries and territories, ranking the North Korea passport 96th in the world according to the Henley Passport Index.

== Visa requirements map ==
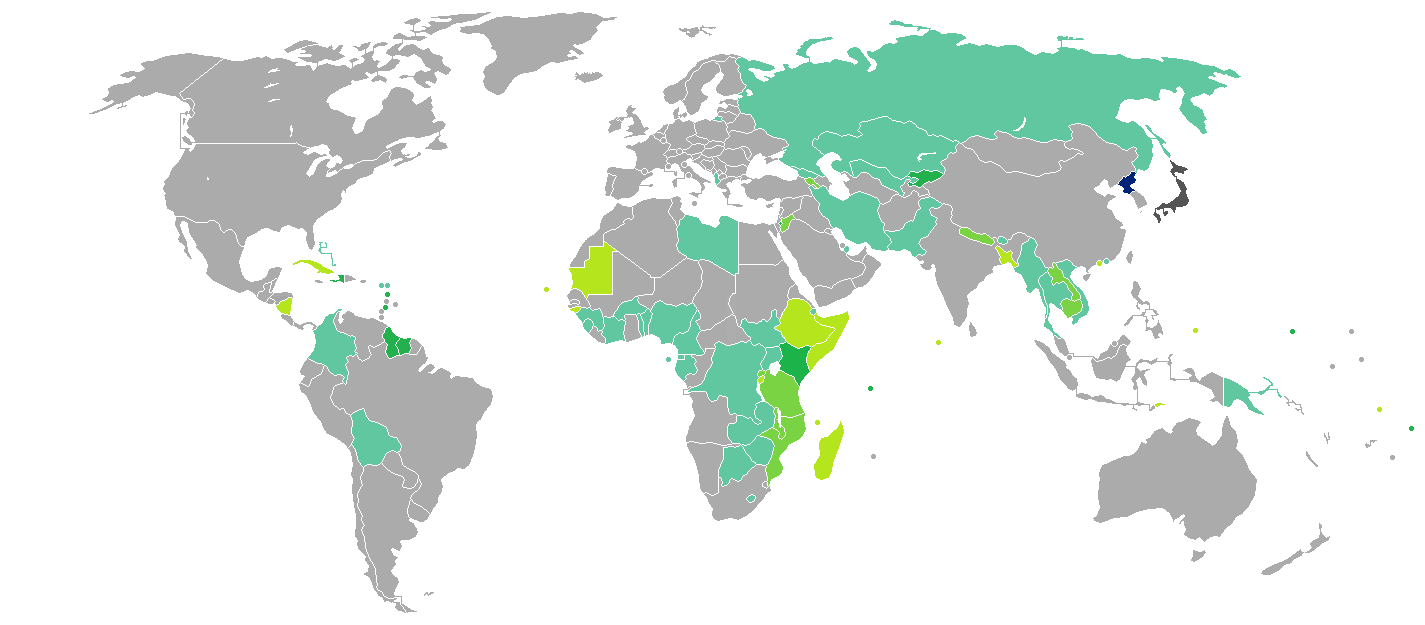
Visa requirements for North Korean citizens holding ordinary passports North Korea Visa not required Visa on arrival eVisa Visa available both online or arrival Visa required Admission refused

== Visa requirements ==
Country	Visa requirement	Allowed stay	Notes (excluding departure fees)
Afghanistan	eVisa	30 days	Visa is not required in case born in Afghanistan or can proof that one of their parents is a national of Afghanistan or born in Afghanistan.; e-Visa : Visitors must arrive at Kabul International (KBL).
Albania	eVisa	90 days	Visa is not required for Holders of a valid multiple-entry Schengen, UK or US visa has been previously used once or residence permit of Ireland, Schengen, UK, US or UAE 10 years.
Algeria	Visa required		
Andorra	Visa required		
Angola	Visa required		
Antigua and Barbuda	eVisa		North Koreans with a visa or residency issued by Canada, USA, United Kingdom or a Schengen Member State can obtain a visa upon arrival that costs USD100 for a maximum of 30 days.
Argentina	Visa required		
Armenia	eVisa / Visa on arrival	120 days	
Australia	Online Visa required		May apply online (Online Visitor e600 visa).
Austria	Visa required		
Azerbaijan	Visa required		
Bahamas	eVisa		
Bahrain	Visa required		
Bangladesh	Visa on arrival	30 days	
Barbados	Visa required		
Belarus	Visa required		
Belgium	Visa required		
Belize	Visa required		Bearers of valid visas issued by a Schengen Member State are visa exempt for a maximum stay of 90 days.; Visa is not required for holders of a valid multiple-entry visa or permanent residence of Canada, Schengen or US.
Benin	eVisa	30 days	Must have an international vaccination certificate.
Bhutan	eVisa		Visa fee is USD 40 per person and visa application may be processed within 5 business days with duration of stay of 90 days.; e-Visa applicant is also subject to pay Sustainable Development Fee
Bolivia	Visa required		
Bosnia and Herzegovina	Visa required		30 days visa free for holders of a valid multiple-entry visa issued by US, Ireland or a Schengen Member State.
Botswana	eVisa	3 months	
Brazil	Visa required		
Brunei	Visa required		
Bulgaria	Visa required		
Burkina Faso	eVisa		
Burundi	eVisa / Visa on arrival	1 month	
Cambodia	eVisa / Visa on arrival	30 days	
Cameroon	eVisa		
Canada	Visa required		US permanent resident card (Green card) holders can enter visa free
Cape Verde	Visa on arrival	45 days	Visa on arrival at Sal, Boa Vista, São Vicente or Santiago international airports.; Requirement to register online 5 days before arrival; Also pay the airport security fee of CVE 3400 either online or on arrival.
Central African Republic	Visa required		
Chad	eVisa		
Chile	Visa required		
China	Visa required		Visa is not required for passports endorsed for public affairs or for official trip.
Colombia	Online visa		
Comoros	Visa on arrival	45 days	
Republic of the Congo	Visa required		
Democratic Republic of the Congo	eVisa	7 days	
Costa Rica	Visa required		
Côte d'Ivoire	eVisa	3 months	e-Visa holders must arrive via Port Bouet Airport.
Croatia	Visa required		
Cuba	eVisa / Tourist card required	90 days	Can be extended up to 90 days with a fee.
Cyprus	Visa required		
Czech Republic	Visa required		
Denmark	Visa required		
Djibouti	eVisa	90 days	
Dominica	Visa not required	21 days	
Dominican Republic	Visa required		
Ecuador	eVisa		
Egypt	Visa on arrival		
El Salvador	Visa required		
Equatorial Guinea	eVisa		
Eritrea	Visa required		
Estonia	Visa required		
Eswatini	Visa required		
Ethiopia	Visa on arrival		Credit card payment transactions are not accepted when applying for e-Visa.
Fiji	eVisa		
Finland	Visa required		
France	Visa required		
Gabon	eVisa	90 days	e-Visa holders must arrive via Libreville International Airport.
Gambia	Visa required		
Georgia	eVisa	30 days	
Germany	Visa required		
Ghana	Visa required		
Greece	Visa required		
Grenada	Visa required		
Guatemala	Visa required		
Guinea	eVisa	90 days	
Guinea-Bissau	Visa on arrival	90 days	
Guyana	Visa not required	90 days	
Haiti	Visa not required	3 months	
Honduras	Visa required		
Hungary	Visa required		
Iceland	Visa required		
India	Visa required		
Indonesia	Visa required		North Korean citizens are subject to the calling visa category, a designation applied to nationals considered to have specific vulnerabilities or risks related to ideology, politics, economy, society, culture, security, or immigration.; Prior approval from the Directorate General of Immigration in Jakarta is required before applying for a visa.; In addition to holding a visa, travelers must obtain a reference letter from the Directorate General of Immigration and present the invitation letter submitted with their visa application before traveling to Indonesia.
Iran	eVisa	30 days	Arriving at Kish (KIH) or Qeshm (GSM) do not need a visa for a maximum of 14 days.; Can obtain a visa on arrival at Mashhad International Airport (MHD), Tehran International Airport (IKA), Tabriz International Airport (TBZ), Esfahan International Airport (IFN) and Bandar Abbas International Airport (BND) for a maximum of 30 days.; Passengers who have already made an application, at least two days before arrival, at the Iranian Ministry of Foreign Affair's e-Visa website and present the submission notification at the airport's visa desk may obtain a visa on arrival.
Iraq	eVisa	30 days	May apply online Kurdistan region.
Ireland	Visa required		
Israel	Visa required		Confirmation from Israeli Foreign Ministry is required before a visa is issued.
Italy	Visa required		
Jamaica	Visa required		North Koreans with a cruise reservation confirmation are visa exempted for a maximum stay of 72 hours.
Japan	Admission refused		Japan has banned North Korean citizens from entering as part of sanctions against North Korea imposed by the Government of Japan, since February 2016.
Jordan	eVisa / Visa on arrival		Visa can be obtained upon arrival, it will cost a total of 40 JOD, obtainable at most international ports of entry and land border crossings. (except King Hussein/Allenby Bridge)
Kazakhstan	eVisa		
Kenya	Electronic Travel Authorisation	90 days	Applications can be submitted up to 90 days prior to travel and must be submitted at least 3 days in advance.; eTA fee is 32.50 USD.; Proof of reservation at the hotel where visitors plan to stay is required (if staying with friends, an invitation letter is also acceptable).; Yellow fever vaccination certificate is required if coming from endemic countries.
Kiribati	Visa required		
South Korea	Particular visit regime		Nationals of either Koreas seeking to visit the other must submit the North/South Korea visitation verification certificate and the Departure card to the Immigration Officer at the immigration port and go through immigration inspection. Also, nationals of North Korea must seek governmental authorization before departure.
Kuwait	Visa required		
Kyrgyzstan	Visa not required	Unlimited	
Laos	eVisa / Visa on arrival	30 days	18 (Note: Savannakhet Airport; Lanetoui - Mengkang (China); Meuangmom - Wan Pong (Myanmar); Banvang - Ban Khok Phai (Thailand); Namngeun - Huay Kon (Thailand); Paksan - Bueng Kan (Thailand); Paktaphan - Pak Saeng (Thailand); Pangmon - Ban Huak (Thailand); Phoudou (Thailand); Dak ta ock - Nam Giang (Vietnam); La Lai (Vietnam); Namkan (Vietnam); Namphao - Cau Treo (Vietnam); Namsoy - Na Meo (Vietnam); Naphao - Cha Lo (Vietnam); Pahang - Long Sap (Vietnam); Panghok - Tây Trang (Vietnam); Phoukeua - Bo Y (Vietnam)) of the 33 border crossings are only open to regular visa holders.; e-Visa may be used to enter Laos through the Luang Prabang, Pakse and Vientiane international airports, 3 Thai-Lao Friendship Bridges (Note: Vientiane (Friendship Bridge 1); Savannakhet (Friendship Bridge 2); Bokeo (Friendship Bridge 4)), in Boten (road and railroad), and in Vientiane (at Khamsavath railway station).; Visa on arrival is available at the Luang Prabang, Pakse and Vientiane international airports, 4 Thai-Lao Friendship Bridges (Note: Vientiane (Friendship Bridge 1); Savannakhet (Friendship Bridge 2); Khammouane (Friendship Bridge 3); Bokeo (Friendship Bridge 4)) and 7 border crossings. (Note: Nongnokkheane - Trapeang Kriel (Cambodia); Boten - Bo han (China); Golden Triangle/Samliemkham (Thailand); Khamsavath railway station (Thailand); Namheuang - Ban Na Kraseng (Thailand); Vang tao - Chongmek (Thailand); Dansavan - Lao Bảo (Vietnam))
Latvia	Visa required		
Lebanon	Visa required		In addition to a visa, an approval should be obtained from the Immigration department of the General Directorate of General Security (Sûreté Générale).
Lesotho	eVisa		
Liberia	e-VOA		If there is a Liberian embassy in the country, you are required to apply for your visa directly at the embassy and not through the portal.
Libya	eVisa		
Liechtenstein	Visa required		
Lithuania	Visa required		
Luxembourg	Visa required		
Madagascar	eVisa / Visa on arrival	60 days	
Malawi	eVisa / Visa on arrival	90 days	
Malaysia	Visa required		
Maldives	Free visa on arrival	30 days	
Mali	Visa required		
Malta	Visa required		
Marshall Islands	Visa required		
Mauritania	eVisa	30 days	Available at Nouakchott–Oumtounsy International Airport.
Mauritius	Visa required		
Mexico	Visa required		
Micronesia	Visa not required	30 days	
Moldova	Visa required		Citizens holding a residence permit or a valid visa issued by one of the member states of the European Union or one of the parties to the Schengen Agreement can apply for an electronic visa.
Monaco	Visa required		
Mongolia	Visa required		Mongolian government will hand over North Korean defectors to the South Korean embassy in Mongolia for "repatriation" to South Korea on the grounds of illegal entry.
Montenegro	Visa required		
Morocco	Visa required		May apply for an e-Visa if holding a valid visa or a residency document issued by one of the following countries: Schengen Area, Australia, Canada, Ireland, New Zealand, United Kingdom, United States a residency document issued by Cyprus, Japan, United Arab Emirates.
Mozambique	eVisa / Visa on arrival	30 days	
Myanmar	eVisa	28 days	e-Visa holders must arrive via Yangon, Nay Pyi Taw or Mandalay airports or via land border crossings with Thailand — Tachileik, Myawaddy and Kawthaung or India — Rih Khaw Dar and Tamu.; e-Visa available for both tourism (allowed stay is 28 days) or business (allowed stay is 70 days) purposes.
Namibia	Visa required		
Nauru	Visa required		
Nepal	Online Visa / Visa on arrival	90 days	
Netherlands	Visa required		
New Zealand	Visa required		Holders of an Australian Permanent Resident Visa or Resident Return Visa may be granted a New Zealand Resident Visa on arrival permitting indefinite stay (pursuant to the Trans-Tasman Travel Arrangement), subject to meeting character requirements and obtaining an Electronic Travel Authority prior to departure.
Nicaragua	Visa on arrival	90 days	
Niger	Visa required		
Nigeria	eVisa	90 days	
North Macedonia	Visa required		
Norway	Visa required		
Oman	eVisa		Holders of a GCC state resident permit can get a 28 days visa on arrival that costs 5 Omani Riyals.
Pakistan	Online Visa	3 months	Online Visa eligible.
Palau	Free visa on arrival	30 days	
Panama	Visa required		
Papua New Guinea	eVisa	60 days	Visitors may apply for a visa online under the "Tourist - Own Itinerary" category.
Paraguay	Visa required		
Peru	Visa required		
Philippines	Visa required		Residents of the United Arab Emirates may obtain an eVisa through the official Philippine eVisa website. A valid Emirati residence visa must be shown upon an eVisa application.
Poland	Visa required		
Portugal	Visa required		
Qatar	eVisa		Visitors may apply for a visa on the Hayya website.
Romania	Visa required		
Russia	eVisa	30 days	
Rwanda	eVisa / Visa on arrival	30 days	
Saint Kitts and Nevis	eVisa		
Saint Lucia	Visa required		
Saint Vincent and the Grenadines	Visa not required	3 months	
Samoa	Visa not required	90 days	
San Marino	Visa required		
São Tomé and Príncipe	eVisa		
Saudi Arabia	Visa required		
Senegal	Visa required		
Serbia	Visa required		
Seychelles	Electronic Border System	3 months	Application can be submitted up to 30 days before travel.; Visitors must upload a reservation confirmation(s) for each visitor's location of stay in Seychelles.; Yellow fever vaccination certificate is required if coming from endemic countries.; Payment of the fee (EUR 10) by credit or debit card.; Valid for one journey only and it expires once exit the country.
Sierra Leone	eVisa	3 months	
Singapore	Visa required		
Slovakia	Visa required		
Slovenia	Visa required		
Solomon Islands	Visa required		Pre-arranged visa can be picked up on arrival.
Somalia	eVisa	30 days	All visitors must have an approved Electronic Visa (eTAS) before the start of their journey.
South Africa	Visa required		
South Sudan	eVisa		Obtainable online.; Printed visa authorization must be presented at the time of travel.
Spain	Visa required		
Sri Lanka	Admission restricted		Below are the documents required: Police Clearance report; If the applicant is coming from another country after staying for more than 6 months, are required to provide Police clearance from that country and copy of the Visa; Certificate from a Sri Lankan guarantor & a photocopy of the guarantors NIC; Affidavit from a Sri Lankan JP (Justice of Peace) or a Lawyer; Accommodation information (Place of stay)
Sudan	Visa required		
Suriname	Visa not required	90 days	An entrance fee of USD 50 or EUR 50 must be paid online prior to arrival.; Multiple entry e-Visa is also available.
Sweden	Visa required		
Switzerland	Visa required		
Syria	eVisa		
Tajikistan	Visa required		
Tanzania	eVisa / Visa on arrival	90 days	
Thailand	eVisa	60 days	North Korean defectors can enter Thailand without identification and they can travel to South Korea from there.
Timor-Leste	Visa on arrival	30 days	
Togo	eVisa	15 days	
Tonga	Visa required		
Trinidad and Tobago	Visa required		
Tunisia	Visa required		
Turkey	Visa required		Visa can be obtained on arrival by holders of a valid physical visa or residence permit from Schengen or OECD countries.
Turkmenistan	Visa required		
Tuvalu	Visa on arrival	1 month	
Uganda	eVisa	3 months	
Ukraine	Visa required		
United Arab Emirates	eVisa		May apply using 'Smart service'.
United Kingdom	Visa required		
United States	Visa required		
Uruguay	Visa required		
Uzbekistan	eVisa	30 days	
Vanuatu	eVisa		
Vatican City	Visa required		
Venezuela	eVisa		Introduction of Electronic Visa System for Tourist and Business Travelers.
Vietnam	eVisa		e-Visa is valid for 90 days and multiple entry.
Yemen	Visa required		
Zambia	eVisa		
Zimbabwe	eVisa		

== Territories ==
Visa requirements for citizens for visits to various territories, disputed areas and restricted zones:

Visitor to	Visa requirement	Notes (excluding departure fees)
Europe
Kosovo	Visa required	Visa not required for holders of a valid biometric residence permit issued by one of the Schengen member states or a valid multi-entry Schengen Visa, a holder of a valid Laissez-Passer issued by United Nations Organizations, NATO, OSCE, Council of Europe or European Union a holder of a valid travel documents issued by EU Member and Schengen States, United States of America, Canada, Australia and Japan based on the 1951 Convention on Refugee Status or the 1954 Convention on the Status of Stateless Persons, as well as holders of valid travel documents for foreigners (max. 15 days stay)

== Foreign travel statistics ==
These are the numbers of visits by North Korean citizens to various countries:

Country	2019	2018	2017	2016	2015	2014	2013	2012	2011	2010
China	▲555,028	▲250,654	▲229,467	▲209,521	▲188,337	▼184,400	206,617			
Russia	▲12,494	▼4975	▼11,286	▼12,075	▼20,893	▲23,902	▲23,604	▲22,071	▼18,901	21,167
South Korea	▼0	▲809	▲69	▼0	▼4	▲366	▲40	▼0	▼14	132
United States	▲48	▲45	▼55	▲100	▲89	▲59	▼56	▼87	▲111	53
Sweden	▲239	▼133	▲148	▼130	▲251	▲185	▼120	▼186	▲234	132
Poland	▼55	▲91	▲74	▼49	▲70	▲51	▼22	▲94	▼13	161
Germany	▲117	▼52	▲93	▼89	▼180	▲249	▼239	▲301	▼287	358
Czechia	▲21	▲6	3	▼3	▼5	▲6	▼3	▼6	▼10	13
Ukraine	▼2	▼6	▲240	▲108				▲502	▼220	299
Uzbekistan	▲102	49								

== See also ==
- Visa policy of North Korea
- North Korean passport
- Citizenship in North Korea
- Nationality Law of the Democratic People's Republic of Korea
- List of citizenships refused entry to foreign states
