= Korean Empire passport =

Issued by the former Korean Empire in the early 1900s

Korean passport
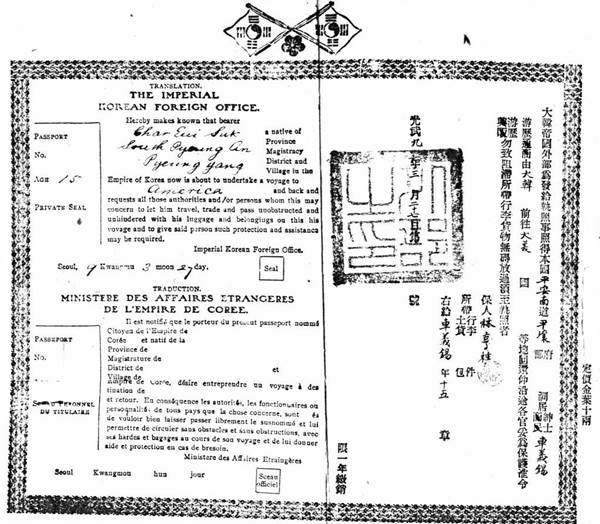
- Korean passport from 1905
- Type: Passport
- Issued by: Imperial Korean Foreign Office
- First issued: 1902
- Purpose: Identification
- Eligibility: Korean nationality

- Korean Empire passport
- Hangul: 대한제국 집조
- Hanja: 大韓帝國 執照
- RR: Daehan jeguk jipjo
- MR: Taehan cheguk chipcho

Korean Empire passports were issued to subjects of the Korean Empire for international travel.

== History ==
The first English-language passports of the Korean Empire were issued in 1902 by the People's Comfort Agency (Korean: 수민원; 綏民院) to Koreans migrating to Hawaii. By 1904, passport issuance was conducted by the Imperial Korean Foreign Office (대한제국 외부). The passport was written in English, French, and Korean Hanmun, and contained the bearer's name, address, age, and destination.

Soon after the 1910s during Colonial Korea, Koreans began having to use Japanese passports. These were not always easy to obtain; the government of Governor-General of Korea issued then as a rule only to a small number of pro-Japanese collaborators (민족반역자) and/or the Japanese police demanded bribes for these passports to be issued. Even these were in fact colonial subject passports just like BN(O) passports and a special permit was required to travel to Japan (abolished only at the end of colonial rule when the Allied naval blockade disabled travels from/to Japan anyway) Thus, some Koreans resorted to naturalising as citizens of China and acquiring Republic of China passports instead. However, for those aiming to travel to the United States this method created its own difficulties, as the bearers of such passports then became subject to the provisions of the United States' Chinese Exclusion Act. Other Koreans with connections to the Shanghai Exile Government were able to obtain travel documents from there; however, its acceptance was guaranteed as the Shanghai Exile Government was only recognized by the then Republic of China (now Taiwanese) government. Once Korea became liberated by the US, the interim Korean administration re-issued the Jipjo.

Surviving examples of Korean Empire passports are rare. One specimen is the passport of An Cheol-yeong, preserved by his son An Hyeong-ju of Hawaii; in 2012, the younger An donated that passport and his collection of nearly 2,500 other documents of Korean American history to the National Library of Korea in Seoul. Another specimen is the passport issued in 1903 to diplomat Min Yonghwan, which is held by the Soongsil University Museum.

== See also ==
- North Korean passport
- South Korean passport
