= North Korean nationality law =

Nationality Law of the Democratic People's Republic of Korea 조선민주주의인민공화국 국적법 Joseon Minjujuui Inmin Gonghwaguk Gukjeokbeop

Supreme People's Assembly
- Territorial extent: Democratic People's Republic of Korea (includes North Korea and South Korea)
- Enacted by: Supreme People's Assembly
- Enacted: 9 October 1963
- Effective: 9 October 1963
- Status: In force

- North Korean nationality law
- Hangul: 조선민주주의인민공화국 국적법
- Hanja: 朝鮮民主主義人民共和國 國籍法
- RR: Joseon minjujuui inmin gonghwaguk gukjeokbeop
- MR: Chosŏn minjujuŭi inmin konghwaguk kukchŏkpŏp

North Korean nationality law details the conditions in which an individual is a national of the Democratic People's Republic of Korea (DPRK), commonly known as North Korea and regulates the status of Citizenship in North Korea.

== History ==
Until 1963, the DPRK had no formal nationality law. This led to situations which were quite unusual from the perspective of international law, most notably the Soviet Union's unilateral declaration that the Sakhalin Koreans were DPRK citizens—in effect, one sovereign state granting its residents the citizenship of another sovereign state, presumably without any consultation.

The DPRK's first nationality law, passed on 9 October 1963, provided quite a broad definition of DPRK citizenship. Specifically, it stated that anyone who had citizenship of undivided Korea and had retained it up to the promulgation of the new citizenship law, as well as descendants of such persons, was thenceforth a citizen of the DPRK. This raised the possibility that every member of the Korean diaspora would be considered a DPRK citizen, as there had previously been no clear procedure for renunciation of Korean citizenship, and few had taken such an official step. The new law also established that foreigners could gain DPRK nationality by naturalisation. The law was amended on 23 March 1995.

The law permits multiple citizenship, and specifies that nationality treaties with other countries take precedence over the text of the law. Due to the lack of normal diplomatic relations between the DPRK and Japan, Koreans in Japan with dual citizenship of the DPRK and Japan have had their requests to renounce Japanese citizenship in favour of solely retaining DPRK citizenship refused by Japan's Justice Ministry.

It is legally possible to renounce DPRK nationality; the DPRK issues certificates of loss of nationality in such cases, which may be required by other states in which a former DPRK national seeks to naturalise. However, such certificates have become more difficult to obtain as of 2011, according to South Korean media reports.

== Naturalisation ==
DPRK law prescribes that any person wishing to naturalise as a DPRK national should petition the Supreme People's Assembly. As the SPA is a rubber-stamp legislature, actual naturalisation powers lie in whoever the Supreme Leader of North Korea is at the time. Naturalised North Koreans without Korean relatives would be granted the songbun "of foreign origin", and are not required to attend ideological training sessions.

There are four main groups of naturalised North Koreans: Soviet Koreans, the Hwagyo, Japanese wives of repatriated Zainichi, and those who have been naturalised individually.

== See also ==
- Citizenship in North Korea
- North Korean passport
- Visa requirements for North Korean citizens
- Visa policy of North Korea
- South Korean nationality law
