= Visa policy of South Korea =

Policy on permits required to enter South Korea

Visitors to South Korea are required to obtain a visa from one of the South Korean diplomatic missions unless they are citizens of one of the visa-exempt countries, in which case they may apply for a Korea Electronic Travel Authorization (K-ETA) instead.

== Visa policy map ==
Visa policy of South Korea South Korea Visa not required with K-ETA (6 months) Visa not required with K-ETA (90 days) Visa not required with K-ETA (60 days) Visa not required with K-ETA (30 days) Visa not required for tour groups (15 days) Visa required except for stays only in Jeju Province (30 days) or designated transit (Note: Airside or landside) Visa required in all cases of entry or transit

== Visa exemption ==
=== Korea Electronic Travel Authorization ===
The Korea Electronic Travel Authorization (K-ETA) is a mandatory requirement for visitors from visa exemption countries visiting South Korea, which came into effect on 1 September 2021. visitors holding ordinary passports from eligible countries and territories must obtain a K-ETA before their departure to South Korea. If the K-ETA application is rejected, visitors have the option to apply for a visa instead.

Holders of ordinary passports of the following countries and territories may apply for a K-ETA:

6 months

- Canada^{*}

90 days

- European Union member states (except Belgium, Cyprus, Greece, Luxembourg and Netherlands)^{*}

- Antigua and Barbuda
- Argentina
- Australia^{*}
- Bahamas
- Barbados
- Botswana
- Brazil
- Chile^{*}
- Colombia^{*}
- Costa Rica
- Dominica
- Dominican Republic
- Ecuador
- El Salvador
- Grenada
- Guam^{*}
- Guatemala
- Haiti
- Hong Kong^{*}
- Iceland^{*}
- Israel^{*}
- Jamaica
- Japan^{*}
- Kuwait^{1 *}
- Macao^{*}
- Morocco
- Nicaragua
- Norway^{*}
- Panama
- Peru
- Qatar^{*}
- Saint Kitts and Nevis
- Saint Lucia
- Saint Vincent and the Grenadines
- Serbia
- Singapore^{*}
- Taiwan^{*}
- Thailand
- Trinidad and Tobago
- Turkey
- United Arab Emirates^{*}
- United Kingdom^{4 *}
- United States^{*}
- Uruguay
- Venezuela

3 months

- Belgium^{*}
- Greece^{*}
- Liechtenstein^{*}
- Luxembourg^{*}
- Malaysia
- Mexico^{*}
- Netherlands^{*}
- New Zealand^{*}
- Suriname
- Switzerland^{*}

60 days

- Lesotho
- Russia^{2}

30 days

- Albania
- Andorra
- Bahrain^{*}
- Bosnia and Herzegovina
- Brunei^{*}
- Cyprus^{*}
- Eswatini
- Fiji^{*}
- Guyana
- Honduras
- Kazakhstan^{3}
- Kiribati^{*}
- Marshall Islands^{*}
- Mauritius
- Micronesia^{*}
- Monaco^{*}
- Montenegro
- Nauru^{*}
- New Caledonia^{*}
- Oman^{*}
- Palau^{*}
- Paraguay
- Samoa^{*}
- San Marino^{*}
- Saudi Arabia^{*}
- Seychelles
- Solomon Islands^{*}
- South Africa^{*}
- Tonga^{*}
- Tunisia
- Tuvalu^{*}
- Vatican City^{*}

_{* - Exempt from the K-ETA requirement from 1 April 2023 to 31 December 2026.}
_{1 - 90 days within any 180 days.}
_{2 - 60 days, 90 days within any 180 days.}
_{3 - 30 days, 60 days within any 180 days.}
_{4 - 30 days for British nationals other than British citizens.}

Date of visa changes

Visa exemption

- 12 April 1967: France
- 17 August 1969: Tunisia
- 1 October 1969: Denmark, Norway and Sweden
- 19 December 1969: United Kingdom
- 1 April 1970: Iceland
- 1 June 1970: Belgium, Luxembourg and Netherlands
- 5 September 1970: Lesotho
- 8 April 1972: Spain
- 3 May 1972: Turkey
- 24 January 1974: Germany
- 1 March 1974: Finland
- 5 May 1975: Italy
- 3 August 1976: Suriname
- 25 February 1979: Greece
- 5 April 1979: Mexico
- 25 June 1979: Austria
- 28 June 1979: Liechtenstein and Switzerland
- 19 September 1979: Portugal
- 22 October 1981: Costa Rica
- 9 December 1981: Thailand
- 25 December 1981: Colombia
- 4 March 1982: Dominican Republic
- 12 June 1982: Peru
- 23 September 1982: Liberia
- 1 November 1982: Singapore
- 9 September 1983: Malaysia
- 11 March 1984: Barbados
- 4 September 1988: Bahamas
- 12 July 1989: Ireland
- 21 March 1990: Haiti
- 30 March 1990: Dominica, Saint Kitts and Nevis and Saint Lucia
- 6 July 1990: Saint Vincent and the Grenadines
- 27 January 1991: Grenada
- 25 April 1991: Hungary
- 1 September 1993: Morocco
- 23 October 1993: Malta
- 27 November 1993: Jamaica
- 24 December 1993: Poland
- 13 August 1994: Bulgaria
- 30 September 1994: New Zealand
- 15 October 1994: Trinidad and Tobago
- 5 November 1994: Czech Republic
- 29 December 1994: Antigua and Barbuda
- 8 April 1995: Nicaragua
- 24 May 1995: Israel
- 15 July 1995: Slovakia
- 22 May 1996: Romania
- 14 February 1997: El Salvador
- 9 August 2001: Panama
- 18 August 2001: Estonia
- 9 May 2002: Lithuania
- 20 May 2002: Brazil
- 27 June 2003: Latvia
- 17 December 2003: Guatemala
- 20 October 2004: Chile
- 1 March 2006: Japan
- 22 December 2007: Venezuela
- 10 January 2013: Uruguay
- 1 January 2014: Russia
- 29 November 2014: Kazakhstan
- 21 September 2016: United Arab Emirates
- 16 September 2022: Qatar

Cancelled:

- Pakistan: 1 October 2001
- Bangladesh: 15 July 2008
- Egypt: 1 September 2018
- Liberia: 18 July 2019

=== Tour groups ===
- China^{*}
Citizens of China may visit South Korea without a visa for up to 15 days as part of a tour group of 3 or more people accompanied by a representative of a tour operator registered in both countries.

On 25 February 2026, South Korea announced that it will be expanding the tour group visa-free policy towards citizens of Indonesia in the future.

_{* - In effect from 29 September 2025 to 31 December 2026.}

=== Non-ordinary passports ===
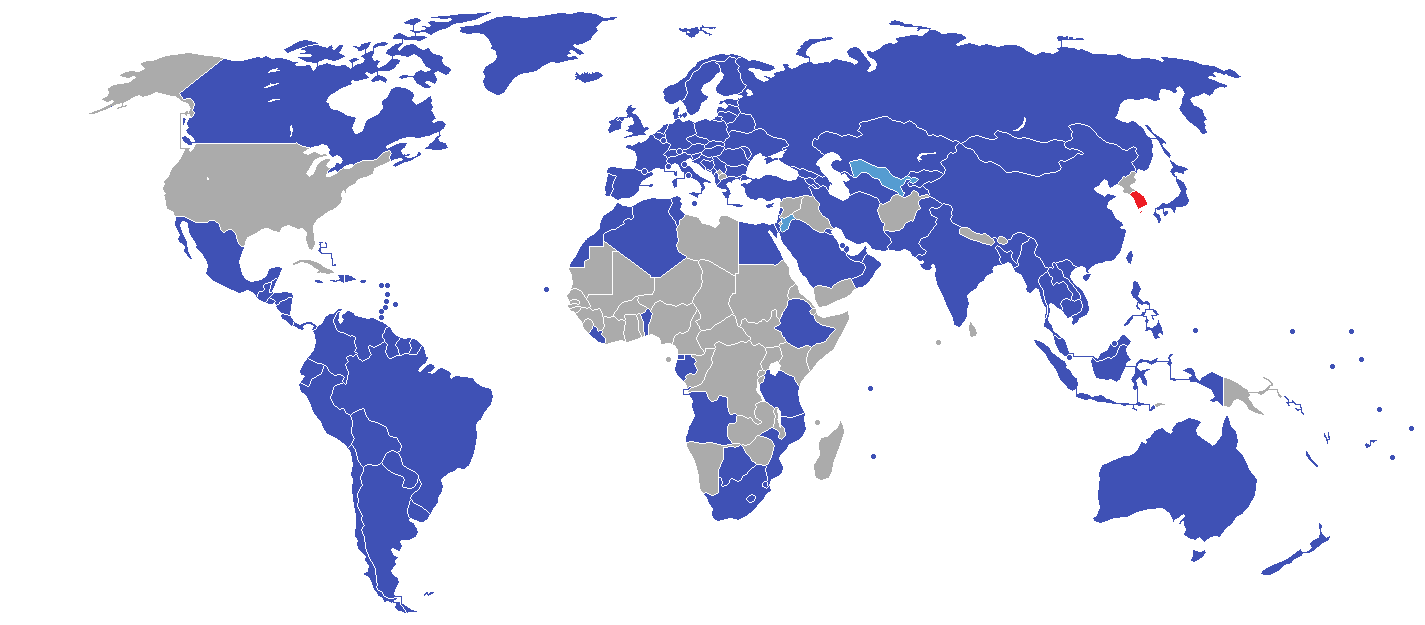
South Korea Visa not required for diplomatic, official or service category passports Visa not required for diplomatic passports

Holders of diplomatic, official or service passports of the following countries may enter South Korea without a visa for a maximum period of 90 days (unless otherwise stated):

6 months

- Canada

180 days

- Austria

3 months

- Belgium
- Greece
- Germany
- Iran
- Liechtenstein
- Luxembourg
- Malaysia
- Mexico
- Netherlands
- New Zealand
- Pakistan
- Suriname
- Switzerland

90 days

- Algeria
- Antigua and Barbuda
- Argentina
- Armenia
- Australia
- Bangladesh
- Barbados
- Belarus
- Belize
- Benin
- Bolivia
- Botswana
- Brazil
- Bulgaria^{1}
- Cameroon
- Cape Verde
- Chile
- Colombia
- Costa Rica
- Côte d'Ivoire
- Croatia
- Cyprus
- Czech Republic
- Denmark^{1}
- Dominica
- Dominican Republic
- Ecuador
- Egypt
- El Salvador
- Equatorial Guinea
- Estonia^{1}
- Ethiopia
- Finland^{1}
- France
- Gabon
- Georgia
- Grenada
- Guatemala
- Haiti
- Hungary
- Iceland^{1}
- India
- Ireland
- Israel
- Italy
- Jamaica
- Japan
- Jordan^{D}
- Kuwait^{1 Sp}
- Laos
- Latvia
- Liberia
- Lithuania
- Malta
- Moldova
- Mongolia
- Mozambique
- Myanmar
- Nicaragua
- Norway^{1}
- Oman^{Sp}
- Panama
- Paraguay
- Peru
- Philippines
- Poland
- Portugal^{1}
- Qatar^{Sp}
- Romania^{1}
- Russia
- Saint Kitts and Nevis
- Saint Lucia
- Saint Vincent and the Grenadines
- Saudi Arabia^{1}
- Serbia
- Singapore
- Slovakia
- Slovenia
- Spain
- Sweden^{1}
- Tajikistan
- Tanzania^{1}
- Thailand
- Turkey^{1}
- Ukraine
- United Arab Emirates^{Sp}
- United Kingdom
- Uruguay
- Vanuatu
- Vietnam

60 days

- Cambodia
- Lesotho
- Uzbekistan^{D}

30 days

- Albania
- Andorra
- Angola
- Azerbaijan
- Bahrain
- Bosnia and Herzegovina
- Brunei
- China
- Eswatini
- Fiji
- Guyana
- Honduras
- Indonesia
- Iraq^{D}
- Kazakhstan
- Kiribati
- Kyrgyzstan
- Lebanon
- Marshall Islands
- Mauritius
- Micronesia
- Monaco
- Montenegro
- Nauru
- Palau
- Samoa
- San Marino
- Seychelles
- Solomon Islands
- South Africa
- Tonga
- Turkmenistan
- Tuvalu
- Vatican City
- Venezuela

_{D - Diplomatic passports only.}
_{Sp - Special passports included.}
_{1 - 90 days within any 180 days.}

In addition, holders of United Nations Laissez-Passer are visa-exempt for up to 30 days.

=== APEC Business Travel Card ===
Holders of passports issued by the following countries who possess an APEC Business Travel Card (ABTC) containing the "KOR" code on the reverse that it is valid for travel to South Korea can enter without a visa for business trips for up to 90 days.

ABTCs are issued to citizens of:

- Australia
- Brunei
- Chile
- China
- Hong Kong
- Indonesia
- Japan
- Malaysia
- Mexico
- New Zealand
- Papua New Guinea
- Peru
- Philippines
- Russia
- Singapore
- Taiwan
- Thailand
- Vietnam

=== Future changes ===
South Korea has signed visa exemption agreements with the following countries, but they have not yet entered into force:

Country	Passports	Agreement signed on
Papua New Guinea	Diplomatic, official	29 May 2023

== Transit ==
In general, visitors in transit do not require a visa to transit through South Korea for less than 24 hours (for Incheon Airport) or when departing on the same calendar day (for all other airports) as long as they stay within the transit area.

The South Korean government has special visa waiver policies for passengers in transit, which are listed below.

=== Transit Tourism Program ===
Visitors who are in transit through Incheon International Airport can participate in an organized transit tour group within Seoul.

The service is free but an entry-procedure fee of 10,000 KRW or 10 USD applies. The tour can be registered in advance or joined after the traveler's arrival, and the shortest tour lasts for an hour while the longest will not exceed 5 hours.

Citizens of the following countries and territories, as well as stateless persons and refugees, are not eligible for this service:

- Afghanistan
- Bangladesh
- Cameroon
- Cuba
- Egypt
- Gambia
- Ghana
- Iran
- Iraq
- Kosovo
- Kyrgyzstan
- Myanmar
- Nepal
- Nigeria
- Pakistan
- Palestine
- Senegal
- Somalia
- Sri Lanka
- Sudan
- Syria
- Uzbekistan
- Yemen

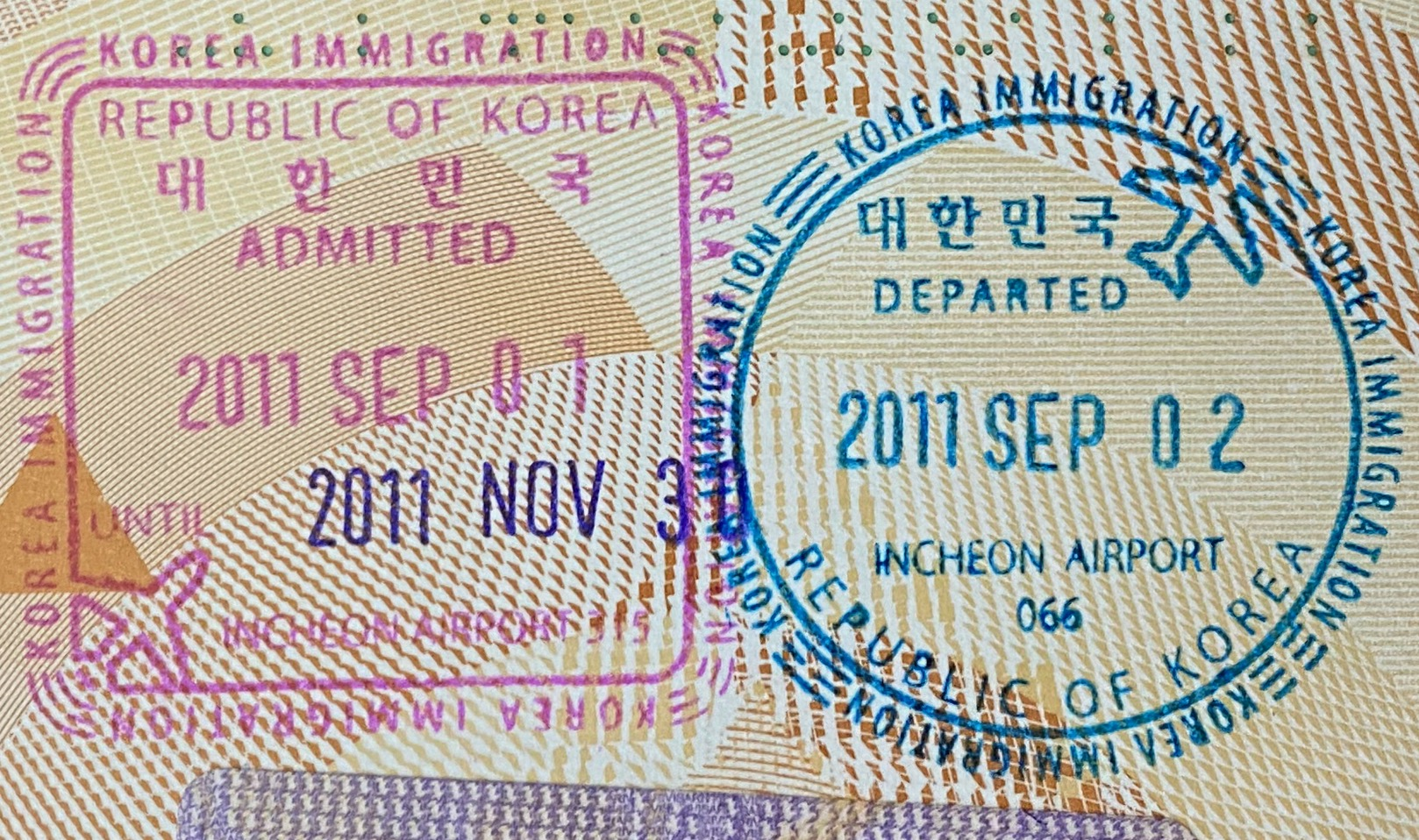
Entry and exit stamps

=== 30-day visa exemption ===
1.Non visa exemption citizens who are in transit through South Korea are exempt from visa requirements for 30 days, provided they hold a physical visa or a residence permit issued by the following countries, and meet one of the routing requirements:

- They are directly arriving in South Korea from one of these countries and going to a third country, or directly leaving South Korea to one of these countries after arriving from a third country; or,
- They are arriving in South Korea from one of these countries and have transited in a fourth country for less than 72 hours before entering South Korea, and continuing to a third country; or,
- They are leaving South Korea after arriving from a third country to one of these countries and will be transiting in a fourth country for less than 72 hours.

- Australia^{1}
- Canada
- New Zealand
- United States

_{1 - Holders of an e-Visa or e-resident permit are only permitted visa-free entry if they depart from Australia.}

② hold a visa (including permanent residency) to enter at least one of the 32 European countries and △ transit through Korea to enter one of the 32 European countries, or, △ departed from one of the 32 European countries and transit through Korea bound for the country of origin or a third country ** Greece, Netherlands, Norway, Denmark, Germany, Latvia, Romania, Luxembourg, Lithuania, Liechtenstein, Malta, Belgium, Bulgaria, Cyprus, Sweden, Switzerland, Spain, Slovakia, Slovenia, Iceland, Ireland, Estonia, United Kingdom, Austria, Italy, Czechia, Croatia, Portugal, Poland, France, Finland, Hungary

This policy does not apply to the citizens of the following countries and territories:

- Afghanistan
- Bangladesh
- Cameroon
- Cuba
- Egypt
- Gambia
- Ghana
- Iran
- Iraq
- Kosovo
- Kyrgyzstan
- Myanmar
- Nepal
- Nigeria
- Pakistan
- Palestine
- Senegal
- Somalia
- Sri Lanka
- Sudan
- Syria
- Uzbekistan
- Yemen

== Nationality evaluation ==
Under article 20 of the Nationality Act, North Koreans and Sakhalin Koreans are eligible for the evaluation of nationality. The evaluation is used to determine whether one possesses South Korean nationality based on the Nationality Act of South Korea.

As a part of the evaluation process, the applicant's personal history, family ties, migration history and current nationality (if any) will be examined by the Ministry of Justice. Successful applicants will be allowed to acquire South Korean nationality (in case of North Koreans) or have their South Korean nationality reinstated (for first-generation Sakhalin Koreans). Descendants of first-generation Sakhalin Koreans may be eligible for South Korean nationality through either express naturalization or reinstatement.

== Jeju Visa Waiver Program ==
The Jeju Visa Waiver Program allows all holders of ordinary passports, except of the following citizens of other countries and territories, to stay without a visa for 30 days in Jeju Province.

- Afghanistan
- Bangladesh
- Cameroon
- Cuba
- Egypt
- Gambia
- Ghana
- Iran
- Iraq
- Kosovo
- Kyrgyzstan
- Myanmar
- Nepal
- Nigeria
- Pakistan
- Palestine
- Senegal
- Somalia
- Sri Lanka
- Sudan
- Syria
- Uzbekistan
- Yemen

Visitors using this program must hold a K-ETA approval before their flight and enter Jeju via direct, international flights landing at Jeju International Airport only.

However, the above-mentioned nationalities are eligible if holding a Certificate of Invitation issued by Jeju Government or Jeju Island Immigration Office, or have previously visited South Korea for 3 times since 1996 or once since 2006 while holding permanent residence permits issued by Five Eyes countries (Australia, Canada, New Zealand, United Kingdom and the United States).

== Group tours in designated areas ==
Tourist groups from the following countries can travel visa-free to Gangwon province and the Seoul metropolitan area if arriving via Yangyang International Airport. This system is extended once a year from June of this year to May of the following year and the maximum stay period is 15 days.

- Indonesia
- Mongolia
- Philippines
- Vietnam

Additionally, tourist groups from those countries (except Mongolia) can travel visa-free to South Jeolla, North Jeolla and Jeju provinces if arriving via Muan International Airport. Likewise, this system is extended once a year from April of this year to March of the following year and the maximum stay period is 15 days.

Citizens of mainland China who are traveling as part of a tourist group with an authorized travel agent may stay in Jeju island for up to 15 days and in mainland South Korea for an additional 5 days if traveling to Jeju International Airport via Seoul, Busan, Cheongju, Muan or Yangyang. Besdies, groups of tourists that hold Japanese group tour visas may stay for 15 days. Student groups of Chinese primary or high schools may stay for 30 days, provided the groups are supervised by authorized members of the school staff.

== Visas ==
South Korea provides visas to cover various approved activities in country.

=== Working Holiday Visa (H-1) ===
The Working Holiday Visa (H-1) is issued to young-adult foreigners in some countries which have reciprocal agreements with South Korea. Holders are allowed to stay in the country for initially up to 12 month (Note: Extension available for US nationals (up to 6 months) and UK nationals (up to 1 year).) and engage in some programs under employment or educational activities. (Note: Maximumly 24 month for Canadian per each opportunity of twice engagement.) However, the main purpose of the trip is intended to be vacation.

People at the ages between 18 and 25/30/34/35, depending on the country, are eligible for a South Korean working holiday visa. A working holiday visa holder cannot be employed in certain jobs such as receptionist, dancer, singer, musician, acrobat, or in places of entertainment where they may endanger good morals and manners.

- Andorra
- Argentina
- Australia
- Austria
- Belgium
- Bolivia
- Brazil
- Brunei
- Cambodia
- Canada
- Chile
- China
- Colombia
- Costa Rica
- Cuba
- Czech Republic
- Denmark
- Dominican Republic
- Ecuador
- El Salvador
- Estonia
- Finland
- France
- Germany
- Guatemala
- Honduras
- Hong Kong
- Hungary
- Indonesia
- Ireland
- Israel
- Italy
- Japan
- Lao PDR
- Latvia
- Lithuania
- Luxembourg
- Malaysia
- Malta
- Mexico
- Mongolia
- Myanmar
- Netherlands
- New Zealand
- Nicaragua
- Norway
- Panama
- Paraguay
- Peru
- Poland
- Philippines
- Portugal
- Romania
- San Marino
- Singapore
- Slovakia
- Slovenia
- Spain
- Suriname
- Sweden
- Taiwan
- Thailand
- Turkey
- United Kingdom
- United States
- Uruguay
- Venezuela
- Vietnam

=== Overseas Study (D-2) visa ===
The Overseas Study (D-2) visa is issued to a foreigner who are planning to study at the undergraduate or above level of school.

Due to the high cost of education and difficulty in attracting foreign students the government considered granting special work visas to parents of students on D-2 visas in 2006. Parents would have been able to remain and work in the country for up to five years.

In the same year it was noted that foreign students often taught illegally to keep up with their finances. Immigration law allowed D-2 visa holders only to work part-time in some businesses which paid an average of 3000W per hour. Students were allowed to work only 20 hours per week. However, students could earn 30000-50000W per hour teaching languages as tutors.

In 2007 over 1800 foreigners on D-2 visas were found to be working illegally. Foreigners who have a D-2 visa are prohibited from working full-time.

2009 saw concern raised over Chinese nationals who overstayed their visas. There was an 11.7 times increase in overstays on the D-2 and other visas. It was also reported that "a number" of those entering on D-2 visas from China were doing so only to find a job illegally.

In 2010, 68 illegal tutors on D-2 visas were caught by the immigration department.

=== Corporate Investment (D-8) visa ===
The Corporate Investment (D-8) visa is issued to foreigners who are going to own and manage a small or medium business in South Korea or who are sent as specialists to work at businesses owned by companies outside Korea. As of 2010, individuals wishing to apply for this visa on their own must invest a minimum of 50 million won.

The amount of money required as an investment by foreigners to obtain the visa has risen over the years. In 1991 a foreign investor was required to invest only 25 million won, then in 2001 this was raised to 50 million won. In 2010 the government announced that it was looking to increase this further to 100 million for a number of reasons. Due to inflation, a rise in the cost of living and other costs they felt that 100 million was more representative of what was required as a minimum investment to start a business in Korea. However, there was also concern that some foreigners were taking advantage of the visa and using it to reside permanently in Korea without actually creating any business. Once the visa has been issued the government doesn't keep track of the investment, so some foreigners were using agents who provided the investment money for a fee in order for them to obtain the visa. Concern was raised that the increase would do nothing to deter abuse of the visa and would instead discourage foreign investment in Korea. The regulations surrounding the visa and foreign business ownership have been criticized for requiring a Korean guarantor even though the foreigner has invested a large sum of money and been given permission to open nearly any business they wish.

=== Foreign Language teaching (E-2) visa ===
The Foreign Language teaching (E-2) visa is issued to foreign language teachers who work in South Korea. Applicants are required to be native residents of a country whose mother tongue is the same as the language they will teach. Applications are required to submit criminal background checks, health checks, sealed transcripts, verified copies of their degree, contracts and a fee to obtain the visa.

In 2007, the government introduced several new regulations to the E-2 visa. Included in these were a criminal record check, health check, and consulate/embassy interview for first-time applicants. In 2008 several English-speaking countries that were disqualified from applying for the E-2 visa denounced it as discriminatory. The Philippines ambassador met with Korean Immigration officials to try to persuade them to change the policy and allow teachers from the Philippines to teach English in South Korea. However, the government had already indicated earlier in the year that they planned to look at expanding E-2 visas to additional countries but it required the approval of various government agencies, so there was no timeframe for when it would come to fruition.

In 2010, foreign instructors already working in Korea on E-2 visa also called the rules surrounding the visa discriminatory because they were subject to criminal background checks and tests for HIV and drug use, unlike other foreign teachers on different visas, such as ethnic Koreans born abroad or foreigners married to Korean citizens. Korean Immigration responded that it was their policy to favour ethnic Koreans and that other nations and territories followed similar policies. Increasing crime was cited as a reason for the regulations, but some teachers felt it was a moral panic reaction to the arrest of pedophile Christopher Paul Neil who had taught in South Korea, but did not have a criminal record at the time of his arrest and had never worked on an E-2 visa. Immigration again claimed the right to decide how and to whom it issued visas. Later in 2009, a challenge was filed with the National Human Rights Commission in Korea over the checks by law professor Benjamin Wagner. Professor Wagner represented two foreign teachers in cases against the allegedly discriminatory requirements that reached the Korea Constitutional Court and went on to be decided in favour of the foreign teachers by the United Nations Human Rights Committee and the UN Committee on the Elimination of Racial Discrimination. In 2017, the Korean government subsequently announced that it was eliminating the HIV test requirement for foreign teachers on the E-2 visa.

=== Residency (F-2) visa ===
The Residency (F-2) visa is issued to spouses of Korean nationals or holders of the F-5 permanent residency visa. Applicants must provide documents proving financial ability and relationship. The visa is also issued to refugees who gain permanent residence status in Korea.

Concern was raised in 2008 that "unqualified foreigner teachers" were using F visas like the F-2 to gain employment in Korea. The government passed a law in 2009 that would change the visas issued to government employees of foreign countries from E7 to F2. In 2010 the government announced that foreigners who invested over 500,000 USD on Jeju Island can also obtain an F-2 residency visa. It was also announced in 2010 that foreigners already on certain visas would be given an opportunity to change their visa to an F-2 visa after meeting certain criteria and accruing a certain number of points.

=== Digital Nomad Visa (F-1-D) ===
On July 7, South Korea's Ministry of Justice announced the Digital Nomad Visa (F-1-D), also known as the "workation" visa, which allows foreign nationals employed by companies outside South Korea to reside in the country while working remotely. Following a pilot programme that ran from January 2024 to May 2026, the visa became officially available on 30 June 2026.

== North Korea ==
Citizens of North Korea seeking to visit South Korea cannot use a North Korean passport to travel to South Korea. They must instead submit a North / South Korea visitation verification certificate as well as a departure card to the South Korean immigration officer at the port of entry and go through immigration inspection in South Korea. They must also seek authorization from the North Korean government prior to departure.

== Visitor statistics ==
Most visitors arriving to South Korea were from the following countries of nationality:

Origin	2020	2019	2018	2017	2016	2015	2014	2013
China	▼686,430	▲6,023,021	▲4,789,512	▼4,169,353	▲8,067,722	▼5,894,170	▲6,126,865	▲4,326,869
Japan	▼430,742	▲3,271,706	▲2,948,527	▲2,311,447	▲2,297,893	▼1,837,782	▼2,280,434	▼2,747,750
United States	▼220,417	▲1,044,038	▲967,992	▲868,881	▲866,186	▼767,613	▲770,305	▲722,315
Taiwan	▼166,716	▲1,260,493	▲1,115,333	▲925,616	▲833,465	▼518,190	▲643,683	▼544,662
Philippines	▼115,696	▲503,867	▲460,168	▼448,702	▲556,745	▼403,622	▲434,951	▲400,786
Hong Kong	▼88,878	▲694,934	▲683,818	▲658,031	▲650,676	▼523,427	▲558,377	▲400,435
Vietnam	▼81,939	▲553,731	▲457,818	▲324,740	▲251,402	▲162,765	▲141,504	▲117,070
Thailand	▼76,568	▲571,610	▲558,912	▲498,511	▲470,107	▼371,769	▲466,783	▼372,878
Russia	▼73,086	▲343,057	▲302,542	▲270,427	▲233,973	▼188,106	▲214,366	▲175,360
Indonesia	▼66,762	▲278,575	▲249,067	▼230,837	▲295,461	▼193,590	▲208,329	▲189,189
Malaysia	▼48,550	▲408,590	▲382,929	▼307,641	▲311,254	▼223,350	▲244,520	▲207,727
Total	▼2,519,118	▲17,502,756	▲15,346,879	▼13,335,758	▲17,241,823	▼13,231,651	▲14,201,516	▲12,175,550

== See also ==
- Visa requirements for South Korean citizens
- Republic of Korea passport
- Foreign relations of South Korea
- International students in South Korea
