= North Korean passport =

Passport issued to North Korean citizens

Democratic People's Republic of Korea passport
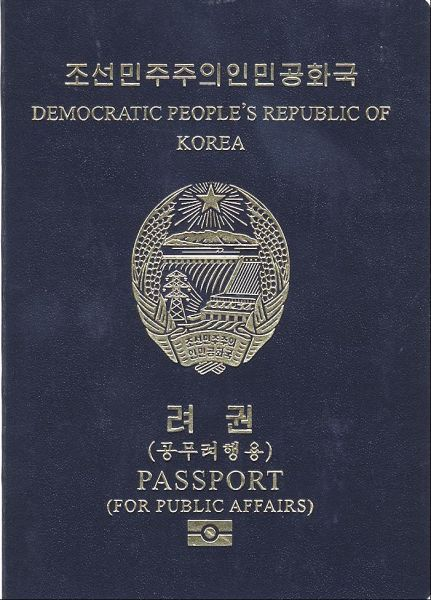
- A biometric DPRK passport for public affairs
- Type: Passport
- Issued by: (North Korea) Immigration Bureau, Ministry of Foreign Affairs (North Korea) General Association of Korean Residents in Japan
- First issued: 1950s (first version); 2016 (biometric passport)
- Purpose: Identification and outside travel
- Eligibility: North Korean citizenship
- Expiration: 5 years

The Democratic People's Republic of Korea passport (Korean: 조선민주주의인민공화국 려권), commonly referred to as the North Korean passport or the DPRK passport, is the passport which may be issued to North Korean citizens for international travel. Since the majority of citizens of North Korea do not get opportunities to leave the country, even through legal means, in most cases passport applications are rejected, and government passports are rarely issued.

== History ==
The earliest passports of the Korean Peninsula were issued in 1902 by the Korean Empire, with two types, a trading passport and a travel passport. The passports have Korean Hanja text as well as English and French translations. The People's Committee of North Korea also issued a "Certificate for Foreign Travel" for the same purpose, which had Korean mixed text as well as English and Russian translations.

North Korean passports were first issued in the 1950s with Korean (Chosŏn'gŭl), Russian and Chinese (traditional script) texts, while the post-2000 passport has Korean (Chosŏn'gŭl) and English only.

In 2016, North Korea began issuing biometric passports complying to the ICAO 9303 standard.

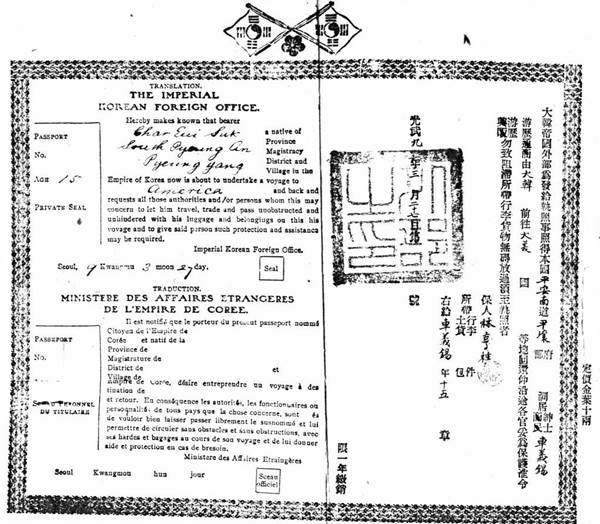
The Korean Empire's travel passport issued in 1905.

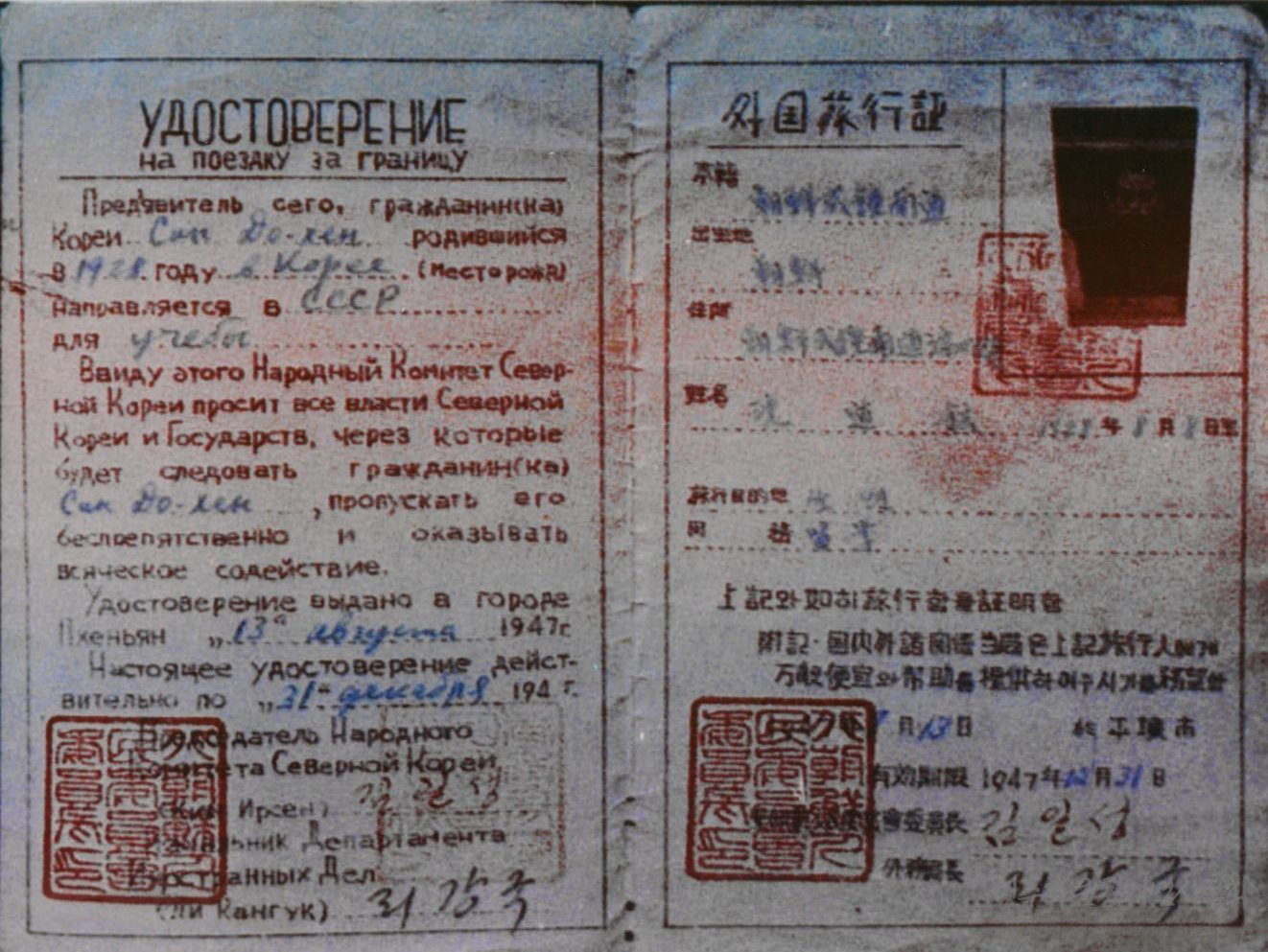
The Certificate for Foreign Travel issued in 1947.

== Physical appearance ==
Standard DPRK passport covers are navy blue/blue with the emblem of North Korea emblazoned in the center. The official name of the country "조선민주주의인민공화국" and "DEMOCRATIC PEOPLE'S REPUBLIC OF KOREA" are inscribed above the emblem, with "려권" (ryŏgwon) and "PASSPORT" below.

== Passport types ==
- A passport (for public affairs) is a single passport which, after being granted special permission, is handed out to North Koreans who visit foreign countries for official reasons, i.e., sports and academic competitions, overseas labors and business trips. Public Affairs passports are taken back by the Ministry of Foreign Affairs after returning to North Korea. The cover is navy blue.
- A service passport is issued for trade and other economic bureaucrats travelling abroad. The cover is green.
- A diplomatic passport is issued to high officials from the Ministry of Foreign Affairs, the Central Committee of the Workers' Party of Korea, and other subordinate offices of the Workers' Party of Korea. For other bureaucrats, only vice ministers or higher can receive a diplomatic passport. The cover is red.
- An ordinary passport is issued to North Koreans who travel abroad for non-official reasons. Since North Koreans cannot legally leave the country for personal reasons, this passport is extremely rare and is usually issued to Koreans in Japan by the General Association of Korean Residents in Japan for traveling to North Korea. The cover is blue.

Service and diplomatic passports must be returned and kept in the passport office, from where it can be retrieved for any further foreign travel. No passports are ever issued without special permission and holders must apply for an exit visa in order to legally leave the country. Additionally, holders must also apply for a foreign visa in advance unless their destination country offers visa-free/ visa-on-arrival access to DPRK passport holders.

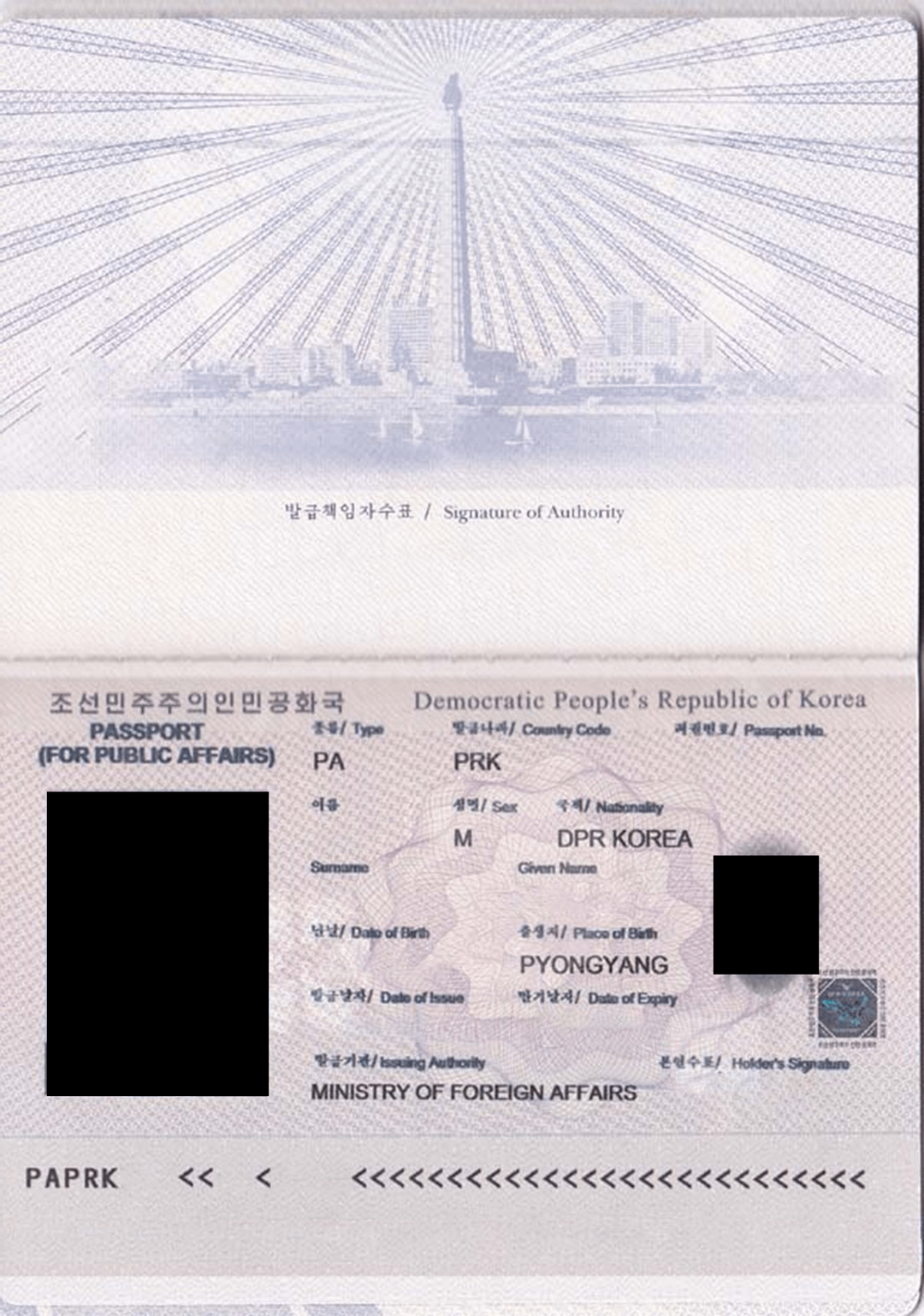
Polycarbonate page

== Identity pages ==
A passport includes two identity pages. The first identifies the holder, and includes the following information:

1. Passport number
2. Name in full (in Latin and Korean scripts)
3. Date of birth (YY-MM-DD)
4. Place of birth
5. Nationality (specified as "Korean")
6. Length of the passport validity (five years)
7. Expiry date (YY-MM-DD)
8. Issue date (YY-MM-DD)

The second page is for official endorsements.

== Note of passport ==
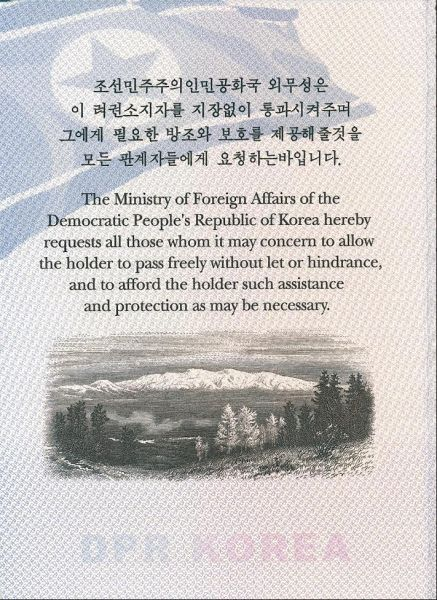
Note

The passport contains the following note:

Korean:

이 려권소지자는 조선민주주의인민공화국의 보호를 받습니다. 이 려권소지자를 지장없이 통과시켜 주며 그에게 필요한 편의와 보호를 베풀어 줄것을 모든 관계자들에게 요청하는 바입니다.

English:

The holder of this passport is under the protection of the Democratic People's Republic of Korea. All those whom it may concern are hereby requested to allow the holder to pass freely without let or hindrance, and to afford the holder with assistance and protection as may be necessary.

Visa requirements for North Korean citizens North Korea Visa free Visa issued upon arrival eVisa Visa available both on arrival or online Visa required prior to arrival Admission refused

== Gallery ==
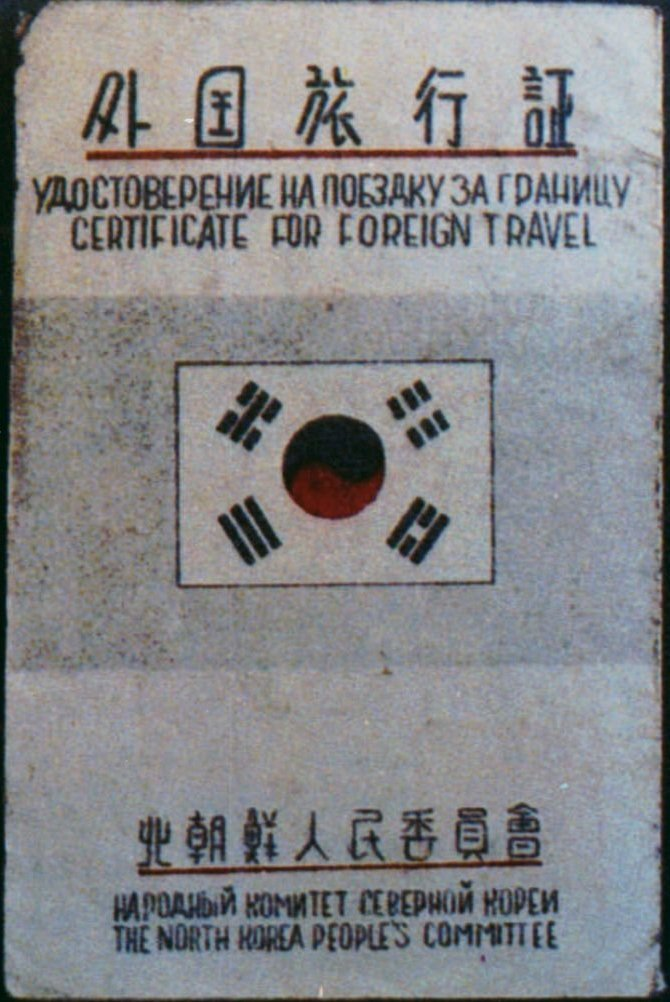
1947 North Korean Certificate for Foreign Travel front cover

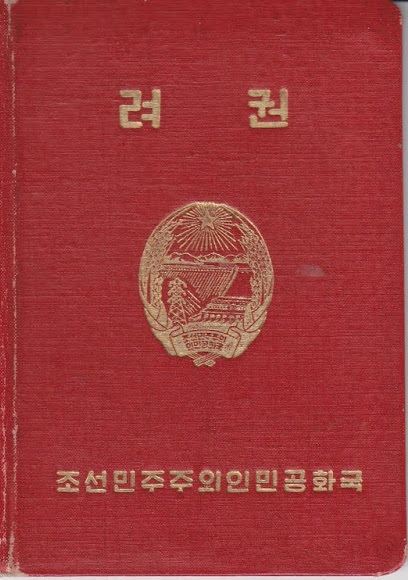
1950s DPRK passport

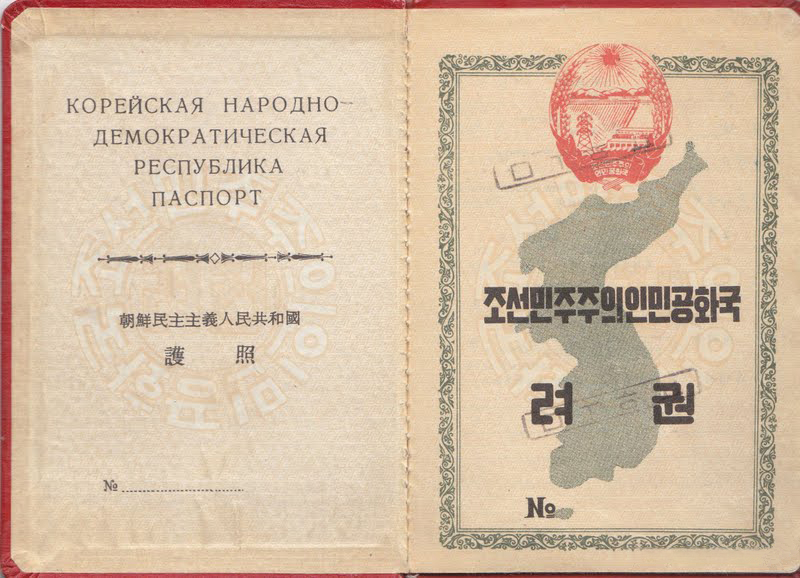
1950s DPRK passport, inner page

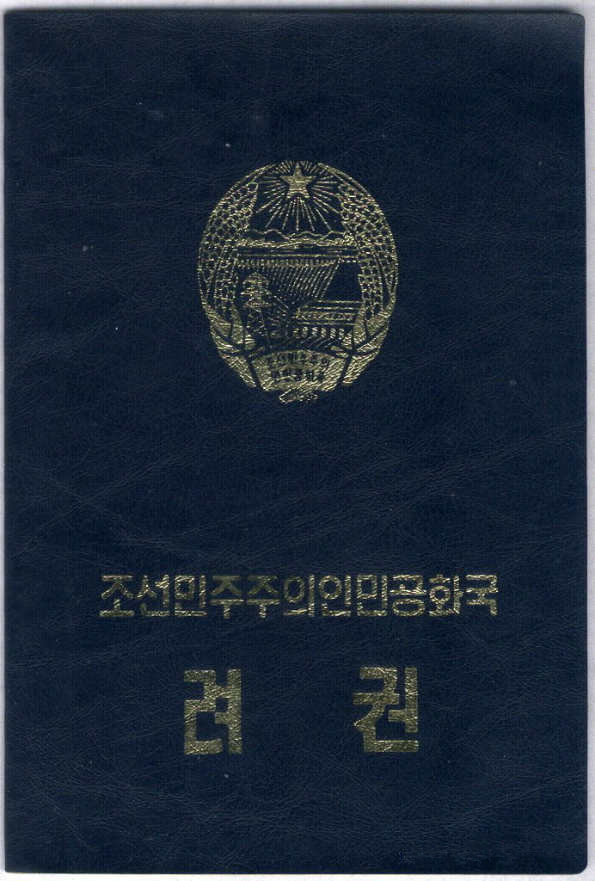
1990s-edition passport cover

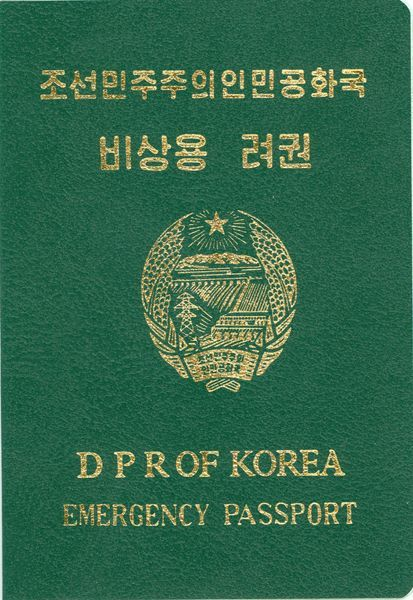
2000-edition emergency DPRK passport

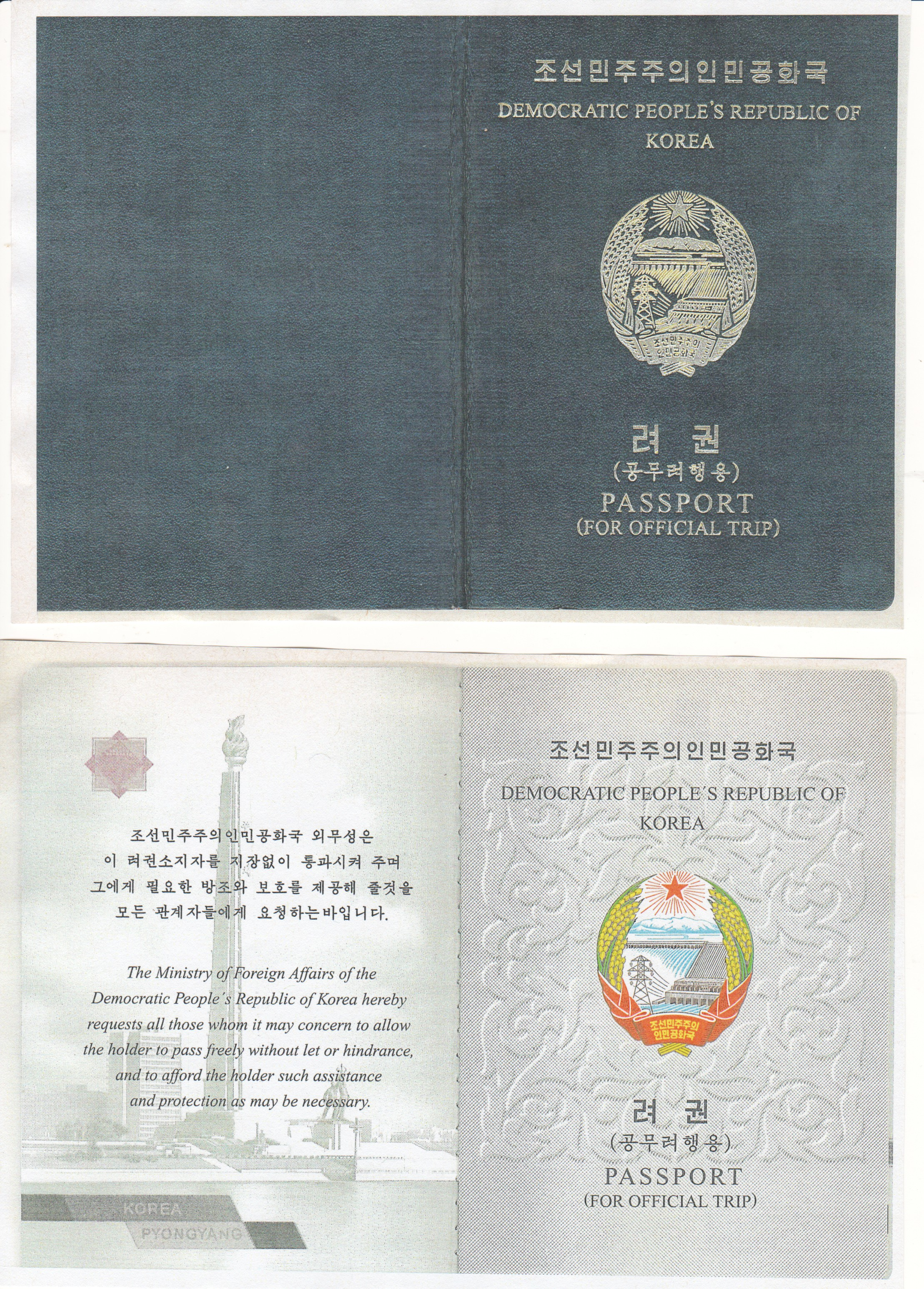
Public Affairs passport, 2019

== See also ==
- Citizenship in North Korea
- Nationality Law of the Democratic People's Republic of Korea
- North Korean identity card
- Visa requirements for North Korean citizens
- South Korean passport
- Visa policy of North Korea
- Korean Empire passport
