= Citizenship in North Korea =

National citizenship

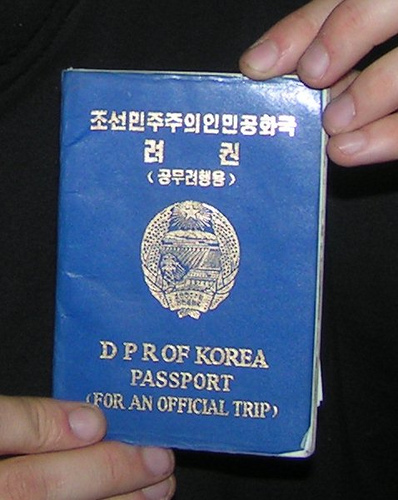
North Korean passport

Citizenship in North Korea is a status given to individuals recognized as North Korean by the government of the country. It is a source of shared national identity, but can also be one of contention or conflict.

== Nationality law of the DPRK ==
North Korea adopted a nationality law in 1963, 15 years after being founded on 9 September 1948. It has since been revised in 1995 and 1999. The nationality law of the Democratic People's Republic of Korea (DPRK) governs who is a citizen of the DPRK, and how one may gain or lose such citizenship. It prescribes citizenship qualifications, citizen rights, and citizen protections. While containing just 16 articles, it covers most of the basic features which can be found across modern citizenship legislation in other nations.

== See also ==
- Democratic People's Republic of Korea passport
- Korean reunification
- Nationality Law of the Democratic People's Republic of Korea
- South Korean defectors
