= Im Jong-seok =

South Korean politician

- 임종석
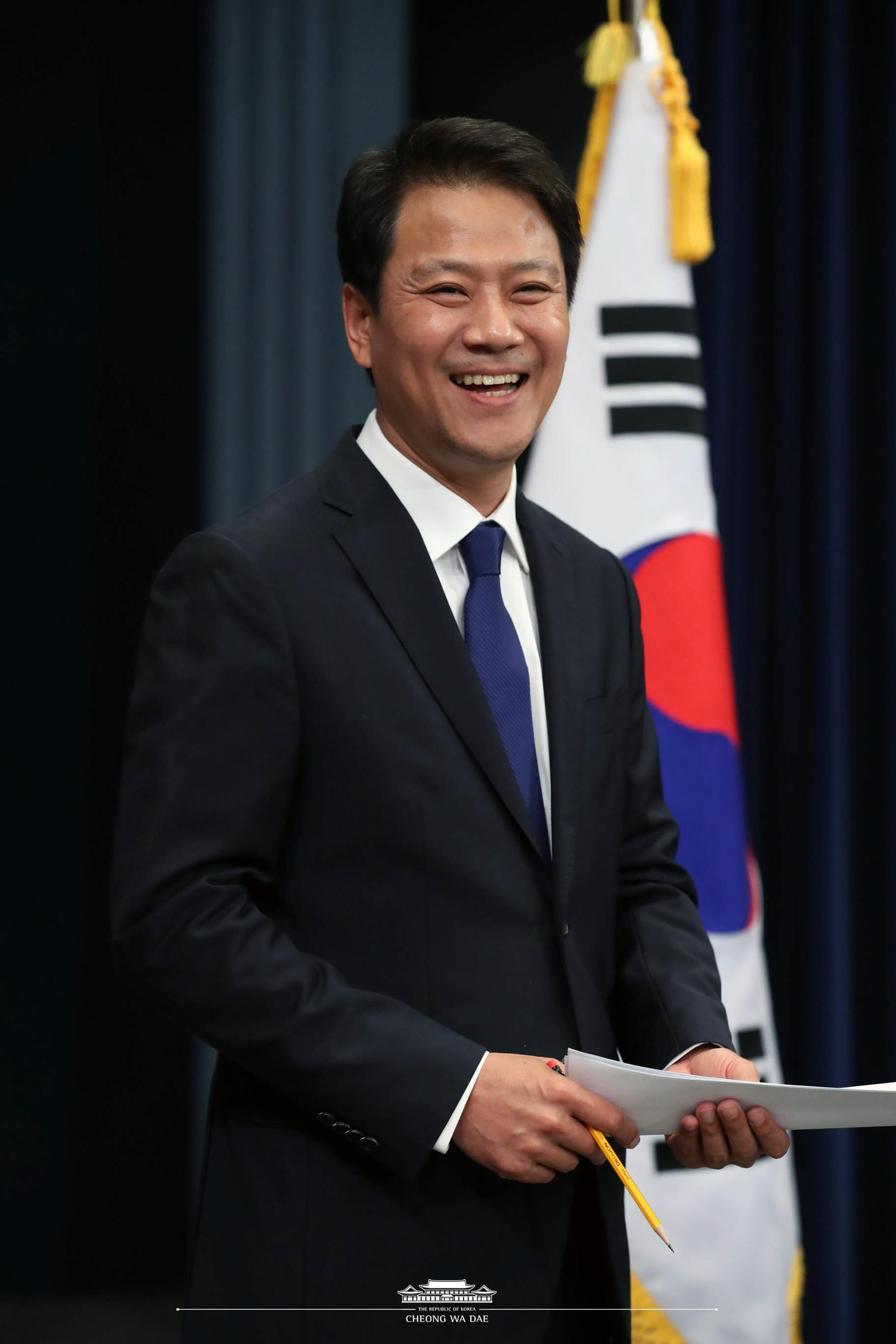

Chief of Staff to the President
- In office 10 May 2017 – 8 January 2019
- President: Moon Jae-in
- Succeeded by: Noh Young-min

Personal details
- Born: 24 April 1966 (age 60) Jangheung, South Jeolla Province, South Korea
- Party: Democratic
- Education: Hanyang University

Korean name
- Hangul: 임종석
- Hanja: 任鍾晳
- RR: Im Jongseok
- MR: Im Chongsŏk

Im Jong-seok (Korean: 임종석; Hanja: 任鍾晳; born 24 April 1966) is a South Korean politician and former Chief of Staff for Moon Jae-in. He formerly served as Moon's Special Advisor for Foreign Affairs and Special Envoy to UAE. Im served as Moon's chief of staff during the primary and 2017 presidential election.

Im previously served as vice/deputy mayor for political/state affairs under Seoul Mayor Park Won-soon, a two-term member of the National Assembly, and secretary-general of the Democratic Party of Korea. He was a prominent student activist in the pro-democracy movement during the 1980s. Im was head of the National Council of Student Representatives in 1989 and served three and a half years in prison for facilitating Lim Su-kyung's unauthorized visit to North Korea in violation of the National Security Law.

Since 2020, Im has served as the Chairperson of the Inter-Korean Economic and Cultural Cooperation Foundation. During the 2024 legislative elections, Im sought to run for the National Assembly in his former stronghold district of Seoul Jung-Seongdong A, but was controversially denied the nomination by the Democratic Party leadership. Following this, he emerged as a vocal leader of the pro-Moon faction within the party. In early 2025, after initially criticizing Lee Jae Myung's leadership style, the two reconciled, and Im served as the Peace and Prosperity Committee Chairman during the 2025 presidential election campaign.

Previously a lifelong advocate for Korean unification, Im caused a major political controversy in September 2024 during a speech commemorating the sixth anniversary of the 2018 Pyongyang Declaration. Reversing his decades-long pro-unification stance, he argued that South Korea should abandon the goal of unification and accept a "two-state" reality on the Korean Peninsula, mirroring similar policy shifts by North Korea. Furthermore, he suggested removing the territorial clause from South Korea's Constitution and reorganizing the Ministry of Unification. His remarks drew intense backlash and condemnation from both conservative and liberal political circles.

== Personal life ==
Im was born in Jangheung, South Jeolla in 1966. He is married with one daughter.

== Election results ==
Year	Elections	Constituency	Political party	Votes (%)	Results
2000	16th National Assembly General Election	Seongdong (Seoul)	MDP	68,481 (48.39%)	Won
2004	17th National Assembly General Election	Seongdong B (Seoul)	Uri	36,467 (49.61%)	Won
2008	18th National Assembly General Election	Seongdong B (Seoul)	UDP	26,718 (46.67%)	Defeated

== See also ==
- Chief Presidential Secretary
