= Visa requirements for South Korean citizens =

Administrative entry restrictions

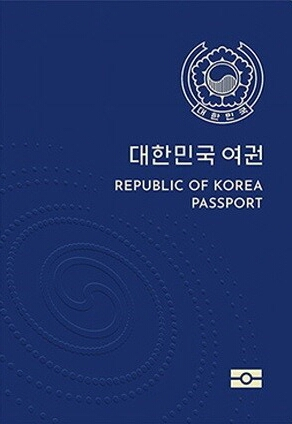
South Korean passport

As of 2026, South Korean citizens have visa-free or visa on arrival access to 187 countries and territories, ranking the South Korean passport 2nd in the world according to the Henley Passport Index.

As of 2026, the passports of South Korea, Andorra, Brunei, Chile, Israel and Palau are the only ones to provide visa-free access to all G8 countries, and the passports of South Korea, Andorra, Antigua and Barbuda, Argentina, Brazil, Chile, Hong Kong, Israel, Palau and Uruguay are the only ones to provide visa-free access to all European countries. (Note: South Korean citizens are currently prohibited from entering Ukraine due to safety concerns.) In addition, the South Korean passport provides visa-free access to the largest area of the world.

The South Korean government has banned travel to several countries to ensure the safety of its citizens. Neither consular assistance nor protections will be provided to people traveling to those countries with the South Korean passport, unless they have been given special authorization before traveling.

== Visa requirements map ==
Visa requirements for South Korean citizens holding ordinary passports South Korea Visa not required / ESTA / ETA (Note: ETA required for Australia, Canada if arriving by air, Israel, Kenya, Mozambique, New Zealand, Saint Kitts and Nevis, Seychelles and the United Kingdom) Visa on arrival eVisa Visa available both on arrival or online Visa required Visit Certificate from the Ministry of Unification required

== Visa requirements ==
Visa requirements for holders of normal passports travelling for tourist purposes:

Country / Region	Visa requirement	Allowed stay	Notes (excluding departure fees)
Afghanistan	eVisa; Travel banned		Travel has been banned since July 2007 after the South Korean hostage crisis in Afghanistan.; Separately, according to visa policy of Afghanistan, visitors can apply for an e-Visa. They must arrive at Kabul International (KBL).
Albania	Visa not required	90 days	
Algeria	Visa required		Persons may be denied entry if entering with a passport containing visas or stamps issued by Israel.; Visitors on tours organized to some southern regions by an approved travel agency may obtain a visa on arrival for up to 30 days.
Andorra	Visa not required	90 days	
Angola	Visa not required	30 days	30 days per trip, but no more than 90 days within any 1 calendar year for tourism purposes only.; Visitors must have a return/onward ticket and a hotel reservation confirmation.; An International Certificate of Vaccination is required.
Antigua and Barbuda	Visa not required	6 months	
Argentina	Visa not required	90 days	
Armenia	Visa not required	180 days	As of 15 April 2023, due to safety concerns, the South Korean government bans its citizens from visiting within 10km from the Azerbaijani border.
Australia	Electronic Travel Authority	90 days	90 days on each visit in 12-month period if granted. May enter using SmartGate on arrival in Australia.
Austria	Visa not required	90 days	90 days within any 180-day period in the Schengen Area.
Azerbaijan	Visa not required	30 days	Upon arrival at the any international airport, visitors can obtain visa through a kiosk.; As of 15 April 2023, due to safety concerns, the South Korean government bans its citizens from visiting within 5km from the Armenian border.; As of 1 July 2026 to 30 June 2027, temporary visa free for Rep. of Korean and Japanese.
Bahamas	Visa not required	3 months	
Bahrain	eVisa / Visa on arrival	14 days	
Bangladesh	Visa on arrival	30 days	Not available at all entry points.
Barbados	Visa not required	90 days	
Belarus	Visa not required / eVisa	30 days	Must arrive and leave via Minsk National Airport and not flights to/from Russia; e-Visa is available at land border and airport.; As of 8 March 2022, due to safety concerns, the South Korean government bans its citizens from visiting within 30km from the Ukrainian border.
Belgium	Visa not required	90 days	90 days within any 180-day period in the Schengen Area.
Belize	Visa not required	90 days	
Benin	eVisa	30 days	Must have an international vaccination certificate.; Three types of electronic visa are offered: the e-Visa valid for 30 days for a single entry (50 EUR), the e-Visa valid for 30 days for several (multiple) entries (75 EUR), and the e-Visa valid for 90 days to make several (multiple) entries (100 EUR).
Bhutan	eVisa	90 days	The Sustainable Development Fee (SDF) of 200 USD per person, per night for almost all visitors to Bhutan. Additionally, if payment is made in US dollars from September 1, 2023 to August 31, 2027, the SDF is 100 USD.
Bolivia	Visa not required	90 days	
Bosnia and Herzegovina	Visa not required	90 days	
Botswana	Visa not required	90 days	90 days within any year period.
Brazil	Visa not required	90 days	
Brunei	Visa not required	30 days	
Bulgaria	Visa not required	90 days	90 days within any 180-day period in the Schengen Area.
Burkina Faso	eVisa	30 days	
Burundi	Online Visa / Visa on arrival	1 month	
Cambodia	eVisa / Visa on arrival	30 days	As of October 16, 2025, due to safety concerns, the South Korean government bans its citizens from traveling to Boko San District, Bavet City, and Poipet City in Kampot Province.
Cameroon	eVisa	30 days	
Canada	Electronic Travel Authorization	6 months	eTA required if arriving by air.; Also, an eTA not required when arriving by car, bus, train or boat (including a cruise ship).
Cape Verde	Visa on arrival	30 days	Available at Sal, Boa Vista, São Vicente, or Santiago international airports. Cost for a visa on arrival is around 25 EUR.
Central African Republic	Visa required		
Chad	eVisa	30 days	
Chile	Visa not required	90 days	
China	Visa not required	30 days	Visa waiver is valid until 31 December, 2026.; 240-hour (10-day) visa-free transit to a third country or region (including Hong Kong, Macau or Taiwan) using any mode of transport. Must have a confirmed onward ticket/itinerary, and enter through 1 of 64 approved ports.; During which, may freely travel within the 24 provinces permitted for visa-free transit and engage in tourism, business, and visits.; 24-hour visa-free transit to a third country or region (including Hong Kong, Macau, and Taiwan), is available at most international airports, without leaving the airport.; Travellers who need to leave the airport may obtain a temporary entry permit from immigration.; 5-day port visa (Visa on Arrival) for Shenzhen if arriving at designated ports of entry from Hong Kong by land or sea, for stays within Shenzhen.; 3-day port visa (Visa on Arrival) if arriving in Zhuhai or Xiamen at designated ports of entry, for stays within the respective city.; 15-day visa-free entry for cruise ship passengers in tour groups, if arriving at any cruise port along China's coastline, including but not limited to Tianjin; Dalian; Shanghai; Lianyungang; Wenzhou; Zhoushan; Xiamen; Qingdao; Guangzhou; Shenzhen; Beihai; Haikou; Sanya. May further travel inland to all regions of coastal provinces (and equivalents) and Beijing.; May apply for a port visa (Visa on Arrival) if travelling for an urgent, qualified reason. Prior clearance for port visa is highly recommended or may be denied boarding by airlines.
Colombia	Visa not required	90 days	
Comoros	Visa on arrival	45 days	Nationals of any country can obtain a visa on arrival for a maximum stay of 45 days. Also, the cost is 30 EUR or 50 USD.
Republic of the Congo	Visa required		As of January 1st, 2027, an E-visa will be launched.
Democratic Republic of the Congo	eVisa	7 days	As of 1 February 2025, due to safety concerns, the South Korean government bans its citizens from visiting the North Kivu Province.; As of 19 February 2025, due to safety concerns, the South Korean government bans its citizens from visiting the South Kivu Province.
Costa Rica	Visa not required	90 days	
Côte d'Ivoire	eVisa	3 months	e-Visa holders must arrive via Félix-Houphouët-Boigny International Airport.
Croatia	Visa not required	90 days	90 days within any 180-day period in the Schengen Area.
Cuba	eVisa	90 days	
Cyprus	Visa not required	90 days	90 days within any 180-day period.
Czech Republic	Visa not required	90 days	90 days within any 180-day period in the Schengen Area.
Denmark	Visa not required	90 days	90 days within any 180-day period in the Schengen Area.
Djibouti	eVisa	90 days	
Dominica	Visa not required	6 months	
Dominican Republic	Visa not required	90 days	
Ecuador	Visa not required	90 days	
Egypt	eVisa / Visa on arrival	30 days	
El Salvador	Visa not required	3 months	
Equatorial Guinea	eVisa	30 days	
Eritrea	Visa required		
Estonia	Visa not required	90 days	90 days within any 180-day period in the Schengen Area.
Eswatini	Visa not required	30 days	
Ethiopia	eVisa / Visa on arrival	90 days	Visa on arrival is obtainable only at Addis Ababa Bole International Airport.; e-Visa holders must arrive via Addis Ababa Bole International Airport.; e-Visa is available for 30 or 90 days.
Fiji	Visa not required	4 months	
Finland	Visa not required	90 days	90 days within any 180-day period in the Schengen Area.
France	Visa not required	90 days	90 days within any 180-day period in the Schengen Area.
Gabon	eVisa	90 days	e-Visa holders must arrive via Léon-Mba International Airport.
Gambia	Visa required		An entry clearance must be obtained from the Gambian Immigration prior to travel.
Georgia	Visa not required	1 year	
Germany	Visa not required	90 days	90 days within any 180-day period in the Schengen Area.
Ghana	eVisa	90 days	
Greece	Visa not required	90 days	90 days within any 180-day period in the Schengen Area.
Grenada	Visa not required	3 months	
Guatemala	Visa not required	90 days	
Guinea	eVisa	90 days	
Guinea-Bissau	Visa on arrival	90 days	
Guyana	Visa not required	30 days	
Haiti	Visa not required Travel banned	90 days	As of 1 May 2024, due to safety concerns, the South Korean government bans its citizens from visiting Haiti.; Separately, the Haitian government grants visa exemption to Koreans (90 days).
Honduras	Visa not required	3 months	
Hungary	Visa not required	90 days	90 days within any 180-day period in the Schengen Area.
Iceland	Visa not required	90 days	90 days within any 180-day period in the Schengen Area.
India	eVisa / Visa on arrival	30 days / 60 days	Visa on Arrival is only granted at Bengaluru, Chennai, Delhi, Hyderabad, Kolkata and Mumbai airport.; e-Visa holders must arrive via 32 designated airports (Note: Ahmedabad; Amritsar; Bagdogra; Bengaluru; Bhubaneswar; Chandigarh; Chennai; Coimbatore; Delhi; Gaya; Goa-Dabolim; Goa-Manohar; Guwahati; Hyderabad; Indore; Jaipur; Kannur; Kochi; Kolkata; Kozhikode; Lucknow; Madurai; Mangaluru; Mumbai; Nagpur; Port Blair; Pune; Surat; Thiruvananthapuram; Tiruchirappalli; Varanasi; Visakhapatnam) or 5 designated seaports. (Note: Chennai; Cochin; Mormugao (Goa); Mumbai; Mangalore); An Indian e-Tourist Visa may only be obtained twice within 1 calendar year.; Foreigners of Pakistani origin or who hold a Pakistani Passport are not eligible for an e-Visa. Foreigners who are not Pakistani nationals, but whose parents or grandparents (either paternal or maternal) were born in, or were permanent residents in Pakistan, are also not eligible for an e-Visa.
Indonesia	e-VOA / Visa on arrival	30 days	
Iran	eVisa; Travel banned	30 days	As of March 5, 2026, the South Korean government bans its citizens from traveling to Iran due to the worsening situation in the Middle East.
Iraq	eVisa; Travel banned	30 days	Since 2004, it has been recommended to refrain from entering Iraq due to the danger of Al Qaeda, and since August 7, 2007, penalties have been introduced for Koreans entering Iraq.; Separately, according to Iraqi policy, visitors can apply for an e-Visa.
Ireland	Visa not required	3 months	
Israel	Electronic Travel Authorization	90 days	As of 7 August 2024, due to heightened tensions and instability between Israel and Lebanon, the South Korean government bans its citizens from visiting within 4km from the Lebanese border.
Italy	Visa not required	90 days	90 days within any 180-day period in the Schengen Area.
Jamaica	Visa not required	90 days	
Japan	Visa not required	90 days	
Jordan	eVisa / Visa on arrival	30 days	Visa can be obtained upon arrival, it will cost a total of 40 JOD, obtainable at most international ports of entry and land border crossings. (except King Hussein/Allenby Bridge)
Kazakhstan	Visa not required	30 days	60 days within any 180-day period.
Kenya	Electronic Travel Authorization	90 days	Applications can be submitted up to 90 days prior to travel and must be submitted at least 3 days in advance.; eTA fee is 32.50 USD.; Proof of reservation at the hotel where visitors plan to stay is required (if staying with friends, an invitation letter is also acceptable).; Yellow fever vaccination certificate is required if coming from endemic countries.; Can also be entered on an East Africa tourist visa issued by Rwanda or Uganda.
Kiribati	Visa not required	90 days	
North Korea	Particular visit regime		Nationals of either Koreas seeking to visit the other must submit the North/South Korea visitation verification certificate and the Departure card to the Immigration Officer at the immigration port and go through immigration inspection. Also, nationals of South Korea must seek governmental authorization before departure.
Kuwait	eVisa / Visa on arrival	3 months	
Kyrgyzstan	Visa not required	30 days	30 days within any 60-day period.
Laos	Visa not required	30 days	As of 1 February 2024, due to safety concerns, the South Korean government bans its citizens from visiting the Golden Triangle Special Economic Zone.
Latvia	Visa not required	90 days	90 days within any 180-day period in the Schengen Area.
Lebanon	Free visa on arrival	1 month	1 month extendable for 2 additional months.; Granted free of charge at Beirut International Airport or any other port of entry if there is no Israeli visa or stamp in the passport, and in possession of a phone number & address to be visited in Lebanon, and a non-refundable onward or round trip ticket.; As of 7 August 2024, due to safety concerns, the South Korean government bans its citizens from visiting within 4km from the Israeli border. And from 12 October 2024, the South Korean government expanded the ban to the South Governorate, and the Nabatieh Governorate.
Lesotho	Visa not required	60 days	
Liberia	e-VOA	3 months	
Libya	eVisa; Travel banned		As of 2014, due to threats by Libyan Civil War, the South Korean government bans its citizens from visiting Libya.; Separately, according to Libya's e-Visa site, visitors can apply for an e-Visa.
Liechtenstein	Visa not required	90 days	90 days within any 180-day period in the Schengen Area.
Lithuania	Visa not required	90 days	90 days within any 180-day period in the Schengen Area.
Luxembourg	Visa not required	90 days	90 days within any 180-day period in the Schengen Area.
Madagascar	eVisa / Visa on arrival	90 days	For stays of 61 to 90 days, the visa fee is 59 USD.
Malawi	eVisa / Visa on arrival	30 days	
Malaysia	Visa not required	90 days	
Maldives	Free visa on arrival	30 days	
Mali	Visa required Travel banned		As of November 4, 2025, due to safety concerns and threats by Al-Qaeda in the country, the South Korean government has imposed a ban on its citizens traveling to Mali.; Separately, according to visa policy of Mali, visitors must obtain a visa in advance.
Malta	Visa not required	90 days	90 days within any 180-day period in the Schengen Area.
Marshall Islands	Visa on arrival	90 days	
Mauritania	eVisa	30 days	Available at Nouakchott–Oumtounsy International Airport.
Mauritius	Visa not required	90 days	
Mexico	Visa not required	180 days	
Micronesia	Visa not required	30 days	
Moldova	Visa not required	90 days	90 days within any 180-day period.
Monaco	Visa not required		
Mongolia	Visa not required	90 days	Visa waiver is valid until 31 December, 2026.
Montenegro	Visa not required	90 days	
Morocco	Visa not required	3 months	
Mozambique	Electronic Travel Authorization	30 days	Visitors must register their ETA on the e-Visa platform at least 48 hours before travel and pay a processing fee of 48 USD.
Myanmar	eVisa / Visa on arrival	28 days / 30 days	Visa on arrival - from October 21, 2025 for 1 year.; Must arrive via Yangon, Nay Pyi Taw or Mandalay airports or via land border crossings with Thailand — Tachileik, Myawaddy and Kawthaung.; As of 1 May 2024, due to safety concerns, the South Korean government bans its citizens from visiting Rakhine State.
Namibia	eVisa / Visa on arrival	3 months / 90 days	Visa on arrival is available at the following locations: Hosea Kutako International Airport; Impalila Island; Katima Mulilo; Ngoma; Trans Kalahari (Buitepos); Walvis Bay Airport
Nauru	Visa required		Pre-arranged visa on arrival is available. (Simplified visa procedure is available. not exceeding 3 months of stay.)
Nepal	Online Visa / Visa on arrival	90 days	
Netherlands	Visa not required	90 days	90 days within any 180-day period in the Schengen Area.
New Zealand	Electronic Travel Authority	3 months	May enter using eGate.; International Visitor Conservation and Tourism Levy must be paid upon requesting an Electronic Travel Authority.; Holders of an Australian Permanent Resident Visa or Resident Return Visa may be granted a New Zealand Resident Visa on arrival permitting indefinite stay (pursuant to the Trans-Tasman Travel Arrangement), subject to meeting character requirements and obtaining an Electronic Travel Authority prior to departure. Such travellers are not required to pay the International Visitor Conservation and Tourism Levy.
Nicaragua	Visa not required	90 days	
Niger	Visa required Travel banned in most areas		As of November 8, 2025, due to safety concerns, the South Korean government has imposed a ban on its citizens traveling to all region of Niger, with the exception of Niamey.; Separately, according to visa policy of Niger, visitors must obtain a visa in advance.
Nigeria	eVisa	30 days	
North Macedonia	Visa not required	90 days	
Norway	Visa not required	90 days	90 days within any 180-day period in the Schengen Area.
Oman	Visa not required / eVisa	14 days / 30 days	For stays up to 30 days an e-Visa can be obtained.
Pakistan	eVisa	3 months	
Palau	Free visa on arrival	30 days	Can be extended by twice only with a fee.
Panama	Visa not required	90 days	
Papua New Guinea	eVisa	60 days	Available at Gurney Airport (Alotau), Mount Hagen Airport, Port Moresby Airport and Tokua Airport (Rabaul).
Paraguay	Visa not required	30 days	
Peru	Visa not required	90 days	
Philippines	Visa not required / eVisa	30 days / 59 days	A single or multiple entry eVisa for stays of up to 59 days is also available.; Single entry e-Visa is valid for 3 months, while multiple entry e-Visa is valid for 6 months or 1 year.; As of 1 December 2015, due to safety concerns, the South Korean government bans its citizens from visiting Basilan, Sulu Archipelago, Tawi-Tawi, and Zamboanga City.
Poland	Visa not required	90 days	90 days within any 180-day period in the Schengen Area.
Portugal	Visa not required	90 days	90 days within any 180-day period in the Schengen Area.
Qatar	Visa not required	90 days	
Romania	Visa not required	90 days	90 days within any 180-day period in the Schengen Area.
Russia	Visa not required	60 days	90 days within any 180-day period.; As of June 30, 2025, foreigners entering Russia without a visa must pre-register in the ruID mobile app and receive a digital code at least 72 hours before entry. However, this is currently optional and not mandatory.; As of 8 March 2022, due to safety concerns, the South Korean government bans its citizens from visiting within 30km from the Ukrainian border. And as of November 21, 2024, the ban was expanded to include the entire Kursk Oblast region.
Rwanda	eVisa / Visa on arrival	30 days	Can also be entered on an East Africa Tourist Visa issued by Kenya or Uganda.
Saint Kitts and Nevis	Electronic Travel Authorisation	3 months	
Saint Lucia	Visa not required	6 weeks	
Saint Vincent and the Grenadines	Visa not required	3 months	
Samoa	Entry permit on arrival	90 days	
San Marino	Visa not required	90 days	
São Tomé and Príncipe	Visa not required	15 days	
Saudi Arabia	eVisa / Visa on arrival	90 days	
Senegal	Visa not required	90 days	
Serbia	Visa not required	90 days	90 days within any 180-day period.
Seychelles	Electronic Border System	3 months	Application can be submitted up to 30 days before travel.; Visitors must upload a reservation confirmation(s) for each visitor's location of stay in Seychelles.; Yellow fever vaccination certificate is required if coming from endemic countries.; Payment of the fee (EUR 10) by credit or debit card.; Valid for one journey only and it expires once exit the country.
Sierra Leone	eVisa / Visa on arrival	3 months / 30 days	
Singapore	Visa not required	90 days	
Slovakia	Visa not required	90 days	90 days within any 180-day period in the Schengen Area.
Slovenia	Visa not required	90 days	90 days within any 180-day period in the Schengen Area.
Solomon Islands	Free Visitor's Permit on arrival	3 months	Visitors may obtain a free permit valid for 3 months within any 1-year period on arrival.
Somalia	eVisa; Travel banned	30 days	Since 2006, due to safety concerns, South Koreans have been requested to refrain from entering Somalia, and since August 7, 2007, Koreans entering Somalia are subject to punishment.; Separately, according to Somalia's e-Visa site, visitors can apply for an e-Visa.
South Africa	Visa not required	30 days	
South Sudan	eVisa		Obtainable online 30 days single entry for 100 USD, 90 days multiple entry for 200 USD and 180 days multiple entry for 350 USD.; Printed visa authorization must be presented at the time of travel.
Spain	Visa not required	90 days	90 days within any 180-day period in the Schengen Area.
Sri Lanka	ETA / Visa on arrival	30 days	
Sudan	Visa required Travel banned		As of 29 April 2023, the South Korean government bans its citizens from visiting Sudan during the Sudanese civil war.; Separately, according to visa policy of Sudan, visitors must obtain a visa in advance.
Suriname	Visa not required	90 days	An entrance fee of USD 50 or EUR 50 must be paid online prior to arrival.; Multiple entry e-Visa is also available.
Sweden	Visa not required	90 days	90 days within any 180-day period in the Schengen Area.
Switzerland	Visa not required	90 days	90 days within any 180-day period in the Schengen Area.
Syria	eVisa; Travel banned		As of 2011 and 2014, due to threats by Islamic State of Iraq and the Levant, the South Korean government bans its citizens from visiting Syria.; Separately, according to Syria's e-Visa site, visitors can apply for an e-Visa.
Tajikistan	Visa not required / eVisa	30 days / 60 days	e-Visa also available for stays up to 60 days.; e-Visa holders can enter through all border points.
Tanzania	eVisa / Visa on arrival	90 days	
Thailand	Visa not required	90 days	
Timor-Leste	Visa on arrival	30 days	Not available at all entry points but obtainable at Presidente Nicolau Lobato International Airport or at Dili Sea Port.; Fee : transit 20 USD; tourist 30 USD; business 50 USD.
Togo	eVisa	15 days	
Tonga	Free visa on arrival	31 days	
Trinidad and Tobago	Visa not required	90 days	
Tunisia	Visa not required	90 days	
Turkey	Visa not required	90 days	
Turkmenistan	eVisa		10-day visa on arrival if holding a letter of invitation provided by a company registered in Turkmenistan with a prior approval from the Foreign Ministry. Visitors can apply to extend their stay for an additional 10 days.; When transiting between two non-bordering countries, visitors can obtain a Turkmenistan transit visa for a five-day stay. This must be applied for in advance at the Turkmenistan Embassy. Visitors must also submit copies of the visas for the country of entry into Turkmenistan and the country of departure from Turkmenistan. Visa fee is 20 USD.
Tuvalu	Free visa on arrival	1 month	Visa is issued free of charge.
Uganda	eVisa	3 months	Can also be entered on an East Africa Tourist Visa issued by Kenya or Rwanda.; International Certificate of Vaccination required.
Ukraine	Visa not required Travel banned	90 days	As of 13 February 2022, due to safety concerns, the South Korean government bans its citizens from visiting Ukraine.; Separately, the Ukrainian government grants visa exemption to Koreans (90 days within 180 days).
United Arab Emirates	Visa not required	90 days	
United Kingdom	Electronic Travel Authorisation	6 months	
United States	Visa Waiver Program	90 days	ESTA is valid for 2 years from the date of issuance.; ESTA is also required when entering the country by cruise ship or land.; A Form I-94 is required for entry into the United States by land. It carries a $30 fee and can be obtained either online or upon arrival.; Visa required for nationals of VWP countries who have travelled or been present in Iran, Iraq, Libya, North Korea, Somalia, Sudan, Syria or Yemen at any time on or after 1 March 2011 or Cuba at any time on or after 12 January 2021, or nationals of VWP countries who are also nationals of Iran, Iraq, North Korea, Sudan or Syria. Exceptions apply if the travel was in military or diplomatic service of the VWP country.; ESTA is not required for Guam and Northern Mariana Islands.
Uruguay	Visa not required	90 days	
Uzbekistan	Visa not required	30 days	
Vanuatu	Visa not required	120 days	
Vatican City	Visa not required		
Venezuela	Visa not required	90 days	As of 21 November 2025, due to safety concerns, the South Korean government bans its citizens from visiting the border states of Zulia, Táchira, Apure, and Sucre, excluding their respective capitals and the eastern part of Zulia.
Vietnam	Visa not required	45 days	A single entry e-Visa valid for 90 days is also available.
Yemen	Visa required Travel banned		Special permission needed for travel outside Sanaa or Aden.; As of 2011 and 2014, due to threats by Islamic State of Iraq and the Levant, the South Korean government bans its citizens from visiting Yemen.; Separately, Yemen introduced an e-Visa system for visitors who meet certain eligibility requirements (group travel of 10 or more people, business trips, and transit etc.).
Zambia	Visa not required	30 days	Visitors are eligible for a universal (KAZA) visa allowing access to Zimbabwe.
Zimbabwe	eVisa / Visa on arrival	1 month	Visitors are eligible for a universal (KAZA) visa allowing access to Zambia.

=== Territories, disputed areas or restricted zones ===
Visa requirements for South Korean citizens for visits to various territories, disputed areas, partially recognized countries and restricted zones:

Visitor to	Visa requirement	Notes (excluding departure fees)
Europe
Abkhazia	Visa required	Tourists from all countries (except Georgia) can visit Abkhazia for a period not exceeding 24 hours as part of an organized tourist group.
Mount Athos	Special permit required	Special permit required (4 days: 25 EUR for Orthodox visitors, 35 EUR for non-Orthodox visitors, 18 EUR for students). There is a visitors' quota: maximum 100 Orthodox and 10 non-Orthodox per day and women are not allowed.
(Belarus) Brest and Grodno	Visa not required	Visa-free for 10 days.
(Autonomous Republic of Crimea) Crimea	Visa not required Travel banned	Visa policy of Russia applies de facto.; As of 13 February 2022, due to safety concerns, the South Korean government bans its citizens from visiting Ukraine. The travel ban includes visiting Crimea.
Faroe Islands	Visa not required	
Gibraltar	Visa not required	
Guernsey	Visa not required	
Isle of Man	Visa not required	
Northern Cyprus	Visa not required	3 months
(Norway) Jan Mayen	Permit required	Permit issued by the local police required for staying for less than 24 hours and permit issued by the Norwegian police for staying for more than 24 hours.
Jersey	Visa not required	
Kosovo	Visa not required	90 days
Russia	Special authorization required	Several closed cities and regions in Russia require special authorization.
South Ossetia	Visa required	To enter South Ossetia, visitors must have a multiple-entry visa for Russia and register their stay with the Migration Service of the Ministry of Internal Affairs within 3 days.
(Norway) Svalbard	Visa not required	Unlimited period under Svalbard Treaty.
Transnistria	Visa not required	Registration required after 24h.
(United Nations) UN Buffer Zone in Cyprus	Access Permit required	Access Permit is required for travelling inside the zone, except Civil Use Areas.
Africa
Ascension Island	eVisa	3 months within any 12-month period.
British Indian Ocean Territory	Special permit required	Special permit required.
Eritrea outside Asmara	Travel permit required	To travel in the rest of the country, a Travel Permit for Foreigners is required (20 Eritrean nakfa).
Mayotte	Visa not required	
Réunion	Visa not required	
Saint Helena	Visa not required	
Tristan da Cunha	Permission required	Permission to land required for 15/30 pounds sterling (yacht/ship passenger) for Tristan da Cunha Island or 20 pounds sterling for Gough Island, Inaccessible Island or Nightingale Islands.
Sahrawi Arab Democratic Republic	Visa regime undefined	Undefined visa regime in the Western Sahara controlled territory.
Somaliland	Visa on arrival Travel banned	As of 2007, due to safety concerns, the South Korean government bans its citizens from visiting Somalia. The travel ban includes visiting Somaliland.
Sudan outside Khartoum	Visa required Travel banned	All foreigners traveling more than 25 kilometers outside of Khartoum must obtain a travel permit.; As of 29 April 2023, the South Korean government bans its citizens from visiting Sudan during 2023 Sudan conflict. The travel ban also includes visiting Darfur.
(Sudan) Darfur	Visa required Travel banned	Separate travel permit is required.; As of 29 April 2023, the South Korean government bans its citizens from visiting Sudan during 2023 Sudan conflict.
Asia
Kazakhstan Baikonur and Priozersk	Special permission required	Special permission required for the town of Baikonur and surrounding areas in Kyzylorda Oblast, and the town of Gvardeyskiy near Almaty.
(Tajikistan) Gorno-Badakhshan Autonomous Province	OIVR permit required	OIVR permit required (15+5 Tajikistani Somoni) and another special permit (free of charge) is required for Lake Sarez.
(China) Hainan	Visa not required	30 days
Hong Kong	Visa not required	90 days
India PAP/RAP	PAP/RAP required	Protected Area Permit (PAP) required for whole states of Nagaland and Sikkim and parts of states Manipur, Arunachal Pradesh, Uttaranchal, Jammu and Kashmir, Rajasthan, Himachal Pradesh. Restricted Area Permit (RAP) required for all of Andaman and Nicobar Islands and parts of Sikkim. Some of these requirements are occasionally lifted for a year.
Iraqi Kurdistan	eVisa; Travel banned	Since 2004, it has been recommended to refrain from entering Iraq due to the danger of Al Qaeda, and since August 7, 2007, penalties have been introduced for Koreans entering Iraq.; Separately, according to Kurdistan policy, visitors can apply for an e-Visa (30 days) that is only valid in Kurdistan.
(Iran) Kish Island	Visa not required Travel banned	14 days; As of March 5, 2026, the South Korean government bans its citizens from traveling to Iran due to the worsening situation in the Middle East.
North Korea outside Pyongyang	Particular visit regime	DPRK government does not recognize ROK passports.
North Korea Kaesong Industrial Complex	Particular visit regime	North Korean government closed Kaesong Industrial Complex in 2016.
Macao	Visa not required	90 days
Maldives	Permission required	With the exception of the capital Malé, tourists are generally prohibited from visiting non-resort islands without the express permission of the Government of Maldives.
Palestine	Visa not required	As of 29 August 2023, the South Korean government bans its citizens from visiting the Gaza Strip.
(Malaysia) Sabah and Sarawak	Visa not required	These states have their own immigration authorities and passport is required to travel to them, however the same visa applies.
Taiwan	Visa not required	90 days
(China) Tibet Autonomous Region	TTP required	Tibet Travel Permit required (USD 10).
Turkmenistan	Special permit required	A special permit, issued prior to arrival by Ministry of Foreign Affairs, is required if visiting the following places: Atamurat, Cheleken, Dashoguz, Serakhs and Serhetabat.
(United Nations) Korean Demilitarized Zone	Special permission required	Special permission required for south part of Joint Security Area, is only group visitors over 30 to less 45 people and aged 10 years and over, and other areas are restricted.
(United Nations) UNDOF Zone and Ghajar	Access restricted	Restricted zone.
Caribbean and North Atlantic
Anguilla	Visa not required	3 months
Aruba	Visa not required	30 days, extendable to 180 days.
Bermuda	Visa not required	6 months, decided on arrival.
(Netherlands) Bonaire, St. Eustatius and Saba	Visa not required	3 months
British Virgin Islands	Visa not required	30 days, extensions possible.
Cayman Islands	Visa required	Visa not required only if permanent resident of USA, Canada or UK. 6 months.; Visa-free for 1 day when arrived by cruise.
Curaçao	Visa not required	3 months
(France) French Guiana	Visa not required	
(France) French West Indies	Visa not required	French West Indies refers to Martinique, Guadeloupe, Saint Martin and Saint Barthélemy.
Greenland	Visa not required	
(Venezuela) Margarita Island	Visa not required	All visitors are fingerprinted.
Montserrat	Visa not required	6 months
Puerto Rico	Electronic System for Travel Authorization	Visa not required under the Visa Waiver Program, for 90 days on arrival from overseas for 2 years. ESTA required.
Saint Pierre and Miquelon	Visa not required	
(Colombia) San Andrés and Leticia	Tourist Card on arrival	Visitors arriving at Gustavo Rojas Pinilla International Airport and Alfredo Vásquez Cobo International Airport must buy tourist cards on arrival.
Sint Maarten	Visa not required	3 months
Turks and Caicos Islands	Visa not required	90 days
U.S. Virgin Islands	Electronic System for Travel Authorization	Visa not required under the Visa Waiver Program, for 90 days on arrival from overseas for 2 years. ESTA required.
Oceania
American Samoa	Electronic authorization	30 days
(Australia) Ashmore and Cartier Islands	Special authorisation required	Special authorisation required.
(Australia) Macquarie Island	Special authorisation permit	A written authorisation of the Director of National Parks and Wildlife is required.
Christmas Island	Electronic Travel Authority	90 days; Passports and visas are not required when travelling from the Australian mainland. However, photographic identification must be produced for clearance through Customs and Immigration. Normal Australian Customs and Immigration procedures apply when entry is made from outside Australia.
(France) Clipperton Island	Special permit required	Special permit required.
Cook Islands	Visa not required	31 days
Cocos (Keeling) Islands	Electronic Travel Authority	90 days; Passports and visas are not required when travelling from the Australian mainland. However, photographic identification must be produced for clearance through Customs and Immigration. Normal Australian Customs and Immigration procedures apply when entry is made from outside Australia.
French Polynesia	Visa not required	
Guam	Visa not required	45 days
(Fiji) Lau Province	Special permission required	Special permission required.
New Caledonia	Visa not required	
Niue	Visa not required	30 days
Norfolk Island	Electronic Travel Authority	30 days; Visa is issued upon arrival for a visit of up to max stay of 120 days, for holders of a multiple entry Electronic Travel authority (ETA) issued by Australia, valid 30 days beyond the period of intended stay in Norfolk Island.; From 1 July 2016 all movement between Norfolk Island and Australian mainland are considered as domestic movement, however all passenger are still required to carry passports or, for Australian citizens, some type of photographic identification and pass Customs and Immigration. Normal Australian Customs and Immigration procedures apply when entry is made from outside Australia. Passenger not carrying their passports are not eligible to purchase duty-free goods on Norfolk Island.
Northern Mariana Islands	Visa not required	45 days
Pitcairn Islands	Visa not required	14 days visa-free and landing fee 35 USD or tax of 5 USD if not going ashore.
United States Minor Outlying Islands	Special permits required	Special permits required for Baker Island, Howland Island, Jarvis Island, Johnston Atoll, Kingman Reef, Midway Atoll, Palmyra Atoll and Wake Island.
Wallis and Futuna	Visa not required	
South America
Galápagos	Pre-registration required	60 days; Visitors must pre-register to receive a 20 USD Transit Control Card (TCT).
South Atlantic and Antarctica
Falkland Islands	Visa not required	A visitor permit is normally issued as a stamp in the passport on arrival, The maximum validity period is 1 month.
South Georgia and the South Sandwich Islands	Permit required	Pre-arrival permit from the Commissioner required (72 hours/1 month for 110/160 pounds sterling).
Antarctica	Special permits required	Special permits by Ministry of Foreign Affairs required for British Antarctic Territory, French Southern and Antarctic Lands, Argentine Antarctica, (Australia) Australian Antarctic Territory, (Antártica Chilena Province) Chilean Antarctic Territory, (Australia) Heard Island and McDonald Islands, (Norway) Peter I Island, (Norway) Queen Maud Land, (New Zealand) Ross Dependency.

== Access-restricted countries ==
From January 1, 2014 to present, the South Korean government, due to safety concerns, has banned its citizens and permanent residents from visiting Afghanistan, Haiti, Iraq, Somalia, Sudan, Syria, Ukraine, Yemen and other regions for safety reasons. These measures are being extended every 6 months.

Also, South Korean citizens are basically not allowed to visit North Korea except when special authorizations are granted by the Ministry of Unification on a limited basis (e.g. workers and businessmen visiting or commuting to / from Kaesong Industrial Complex). Yet 8 people on 6 occasions, from Lim Su-kyung in 1989 to Ro Su-hui in 2012, who visited one or more banned countries without prior authorization and returned to South Korea via Panmunjom, were sentenced to imprisonment of up to 10 years.

== APEC Business Travel Card ==
Full members of the scheme Transitional members (United States, Canada)

Holders of an APEC Business Travel Card (ABTC) travelling on business do not require a visa to the following countries:

- Australia^{2}
- Brunei^{2}
- Chile^{2}
- China^{4}
- Hong Kong^{4}
- Indonesia^{4}
- Japan^{2}
- Malaysia^{2}
- Mexico^{1}
- New Zealand^{2}
- Papua New Guinea^{4}
- Peru^{2}
- Philippines^{4}
- Russia^{3}
- Singapore^{4}
- Taiwan^{2}
- Thailand^{2}
- Vietnam^{4}

_{1 - Up to 180 days}
_{2 - Up to 90 days}
_{3 - Up to 90 days in a period of 180 days}
_{4 - Up to 60 days}

The card must be used in conjunction with a passport and has the following advantages:

- No need to apply for a visa or entry permit to APEC countries, as the card is treated as such (except by Canada and United States)
- Undertake legitimate business in participating economies
- Expedited border crossing in all member economies, including transitional members

== Non-visa restrictions ==
=== Blank passport pages ===
Many countries require a minimum number of blank pages to be available in the passport being presented, typically one or two pages. Endorsement pages, which often appear after the visa pages, are not counted as being valid or available.

=== Vaccination ===
Cover of the new International Certificate of Vaccination issued by the Bureau of Quarantine in the Philippines since 2021

The African countries of Angola, Benin, Burkina Faso, Burundi, Cameroon, Central African Republic, Democratic Republic of the Congo, Republic of the Congo, Côte d'Ivoire, Gabon, Ghana, Guinea-Bissau, Mali, Niger, Sierra Leone and Togo, South Sudan and Uganda, along with French Guiana in South America, require all incoming passengers older than nine months to one year, to have a current International Certificate of Vaccination or Prophylaxis.

Some other countries require vaccination only if the passenger is coming from an infected area or has visited one recently or has transited for 12 hours in those countries: Algeria, Botswana, Cabo Verde, Chad, Djibouti, Egypt, Eswatini, Ethiopia, Gambia, Ghana, Guinea, Lesotho, Libya, Equatorial Guinea, Eritrea, Madagascar, Malawi, Mauritania, Mauritius, Mozambique, Namibia, Nigeria, Papua New Guinea, Seychelles, Somalia, South Africa, Sudan, Tunisia, Uganda, Tanzania, Zambia and Zimbabwe.

=== Passport validity length ===
Very few countries, such as Paraguay, just require a valid passport on arrival.

However many countries and groupings now require only an identity card – especially from their neighbours. Other countries may have special bilateral arrangements that depart from the generality of their passport validity length policies to shorten the period of passport validity required for each other's citizens or even accept passports that have already expired (but not been cancelled).

Some countries, such as Japan, Ireland and the United Kingdom, require a passport valid throughout the period of the intended stay.

In the absence of specific bilateral agreements, countries requiring passports to be valid for at least 6 more months on arrival include Afghanistan, Algeria, Anguilla, Bahrain, Bhutan, Botswana, British Virgin Islands, Brunei, Cambodia, Cameroon, Cape Verde, Cayman Islands, Central African Republic, Chad, Comoros, Costa Rica, Côte d'Ivoire, Curaçao, Ecuador, Egypt, El Salvador, Equatorial Guinea, Fiji, Gabon, Guinea Bissau, Guyana, Haiti, India, Indonesia, Iran, Iraq, Israel, Jordan, Kenya, Kiribati, Kuwait, Laos, Madagascar, Malaysia, Marshall Islands, Mongolia, Myanmar, Namibia, Nepal, Nicaragua, Nigeria, Oman, Palau, Papua New Guinea, Peru, Philippines, Qatar, Rwanda, Samoa, Saudi Arabia, Singapore, Solomon Islands, Somalia, Sri Lanka, Sudan, Suriname, Tanzania, Thailand, Timor-Leste, Tokelau, Tonga, Turkey, Tuvalu, Uganda, United Arab Emirates, Vanuatu, Venezuela, and Vietnam.

Countries requiring passports valid for at least 4 months on arrival include Micronesia and Zambia.

Countries requiring passports with a validity of at least 3 months beyond the date of intended departure include Azerbaijan, Bosnia and Herzegovina, Honduras, Montenegro, Nauru, Moldova and New Zealand. Similarly, the EEA countries of Iceland, Liechtenstein, Norway, all European Union countries (except Ireland) together with Switzerland also require 3 months validity beyond the date of the bearer's intended departure unless the bearer is an EEA or Swiss national.

Countries requiring passports valid for at least 3 months on arrival include Albania, North Macedonia, Panama, and Senegal.

Bermuda requires passports to be valid for at least 45 days upon entry.

Countries that require a passport validity of at least one month beyond the date of intended departure include Eritrea, Hong Kong, Lebanon, Macau, the Maldives and South Africa.

==== Maximum passport age ====
Countries of the Schengen area require non-EU passports to be less than 10 years old upon entry.

=== Criminal record ===
Some countries, including Australia, Canada, Fiji, New Zealand and the United States, routinely deny entry to non-citizens who have a criminal record, while others impose restrictions depending on the type of conviction and the length of the sentence.

=== Persona non grata ===
The government of a country can declare a diplomat persona non grata, banning them from entering the country or expelling them if they have already entered. In non-diplomatic use, the authorities of a country may also declare a foreigner persona non grata permanently or temporarily, usually because of unlawful activity.

=== Israeli stamps ===
Kuwait, Lebanon, Libya, and Yemen do not allow entry to people with passport stamps from Israel or whose passports have either a used or an unused Israeli visa, or where there is evidence of previous travel to Israel such as entry or exit stamps from neighbouring border posts in transit countries such as Jordan and Egypt.

To circumvent this Arab League boycott of Israel, the Israeli immigration services have now mostly ceased to stamp foreign nationals' passports on either entry to or exit from Israel (unless the entry is for some work-related purposes). Since 15 January 2013, Israel no longer stamps foreign passports at Ben Gurion Airport. Passports are still (as of 22 June 2017) stamped at Erez when passing into and out of Gaza.

Iran refuses admission to holders of passports containing an Israeli visa or stamp that is less than 12 months old.

=== Biometrics ===
Several countries mandate that all travellers, or all foreign travellers, be fingerprinted on arrival and will refuse admission to or even arrest travellers who refuse to comply. In some countries, such as the United States, this may apply even to transit passengers who merely wish to change planes rather than go landside.

Fingerprinting countries/regions include Afghanistan, Argentina, Brunei, Cambodia, China, Ethiopia, Ghana, Guinea, India, Japan, Kenya (both fingerprints and a photo are taken), Malaysia upon entry and departure, Mongolia, Saudi Arabia, the Schengen Area, Singapore, South Korea, Taiwan, Thailand, Uganda, the United Arab Emirates and the United States.

Many countries also require a photo be taken of people entering the country. The United States, which does not fully implement exit control formalities at its land frontiers (although long mandated by its own legislation), intends to implement facial recognition for passengers departing from international airports to identify people who overstay their visa.

Together with fingerprint and face recognition, iris scanning is one of three biometric identification technologies internationally standardised since 2006 by the International Civil Aviation Organization (ICAO) for use in e-passports and the United Arab Emirates conducts iris scanning on visitors who need to apply for a visa. The United States Department of Homeland Security has announced plans to greatly increase the biometric data it collects at US borders. In 2018, Singapore began trials of iris scanning at three land and maritime immigration checkpoints.

== Consular protection of South Korean citizens abroad ==
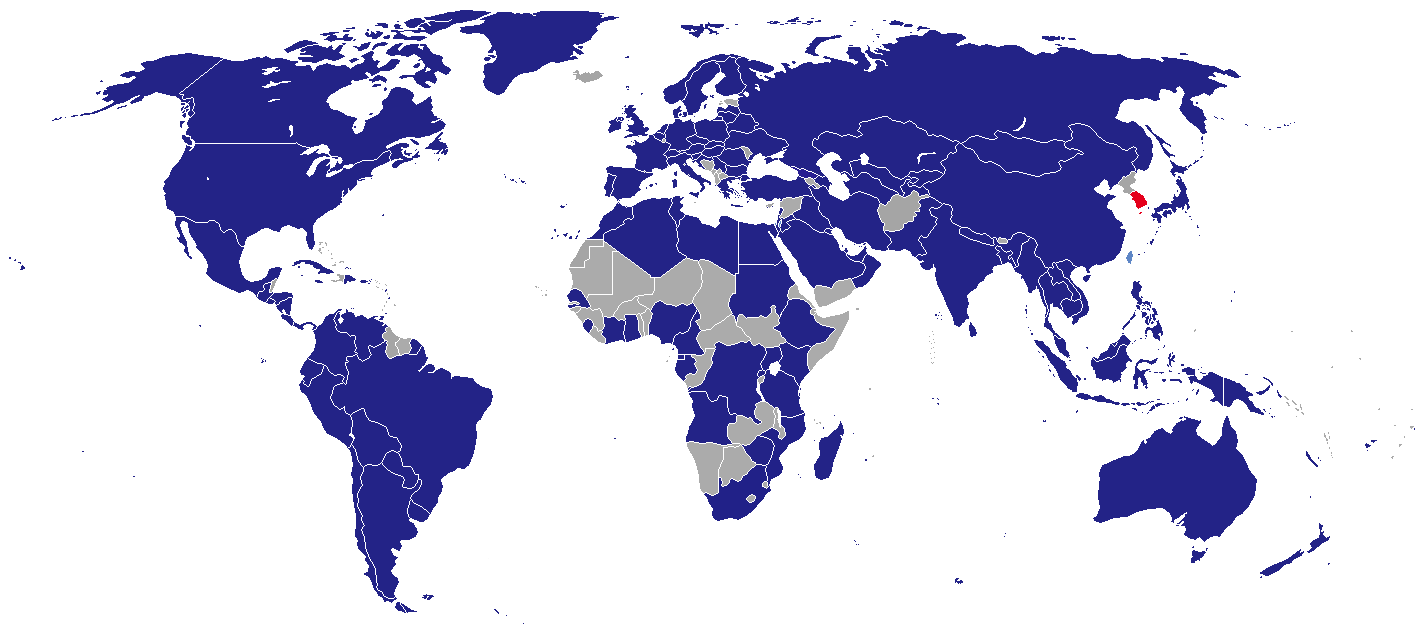
Diplomatic missions of South Korea

South Korea and North Korea each sets the territorial scope in their respective constitutions to cover the entire Korean Peninsula.

So the two Koreas regard each other's territory as part of their own territory and do not recognize the sovereignty of the other side as a country. For this reason, embassies based on the premise of establishing diplomatic relations between foreign countries cannot be mutually established.

Inter-Korean exchange relations are not under the jurisdiction of the Ministry of Foreign Affairs of each government, but the Ministry of Unification on the South Korean side and the Workers' Party of Korea on the North Korean side.

== See also ==
- List of nationalities forbidden at border
- South Korean passport
- Visa policy of South Korea
