= Jusapa =

South Korean political faction

- Hangul: 주체사상파
- Hanja: 主體思想派
- RR: Juche sasangpa
- MR: Chuch'e sasangp'a

Short name
- Hangul: 주사파
- Hanja: 主思派
- RR: Jusapa
- MR: Chusap'a

Jusapa, an abbreviation of Juchesasangpa which translates to Juche faction, was a political faction within South Korea's student movements that supported the North Korean political ideology known as Juche. It reached peak prominence during the pro-democracy demonstrations of the 1980s and was part of the wider National Liberation Faction.

== History ==
=== Background ===
After the division of Korea and the Korean War, most left-leaning political groups went underground. However, as the government suppressed democratic protests and the "Seoul Spring" fell in the 1980s to the rise of military general Chun Doo-hwan's reign, the influx of Juche ideology occurred. The dominance of Jusapa became apparent after a fight between groups with opposing views.

=== Origin ===
The movement started in early 1986 with Undongkwon participating in student movements and labor movements. A book written by Kim Young-hwan called "The Letter of One Labor Activist Sending to All Our Fellow Young Students" (한 노동운동가가 청년 학생들에게 보내는 편지) with the pseudonym "Kang Chol" (강철), also known as "kangcholsoshin" (강철서신, Kang cheol's letter), was considered as the textbook of the movement among participants. The movement was also called the National Liberation faction (NL) because it emphasized the "national liberation" of South Korea based on the theory of North Korean revolution called "The Theory of Revolution of National Liberation and People's Democracy". However, the term "National Liberation faction" can also refer to groups who did not accept Juche but held the same perception that the people of South Korea should be liberated.

=== Fall of communism and its subsequent decline ===
The anti-communist laws in South Korea have had—and continue to have—a negative effect on the perception of Juche ideology in South Korea. However, after constitutional democracy was established after mass demonstrations in 1987, the focus of the movement shifted to encouraging the unification of the two Koreas. This led "National Council of Student Representatives" (Jeongukdaehaksaengdaepyojahyopuihoe, often shortened to jeondaehyop) to send representative Lim Su-kyung to the 13th World Festival of Youth and Students in 1989 in Pyongyang. (Note: this source inaccurately refer to it as the hanminjokchukjeon, but in reality it was the world festival hosted in pyongyang.) After the fall of the Soviet Union, the death of Kim Il Sung and the news reports of famines in North Korea in 1995, the movement faced a subsequent decline. However, in 1994, Park Hong, who was the president of Sogang University at the time, held a press conference claiming North Korea was running a terrorist organization in schools citing jusapas and sanomaeng (South Korean Socialist Workers' Alliance) as examples, which renewed interest in the movement. The statement was made in the context of incidents of students being arrested for making a place to mourn the death of Kim Il Sung.

== Criticism ==
Certain leftist movements in South Korea are often referred to as "chinbuk" (Korean: 친북; Hanja: 親北; lit. 'pro-North'), "jongbuk" (Korean: 종북; Hanja: 從北; lit. 'pursuant to North') and "Jusapa" (Juche proponent) by Korean conservatives, anti-communists and others critical of the North. This perception is reinforced by cases such as Lim Su-kyung, who is best known for attending the 13th World Festival of Youth and Students, held in North Korea and praising President of North Korea Kim Il Sung in 1989. She attended the festival representing the student organization Jeondaehyop, now known as Hanchongryun. In April 2012, she was elected as a member of the 19th National Assembly as the Democratic United Party's 21st proportional representative. In June 2012, in a confrontation with a North Korean defector in a bar, Lim hurled insults and referred to a ruling party lawmaker as a "son-of-a-bitch betrayer" and another as a "traitor" in what has been described by Korea JoonAng Daily as "an alcohol-fueled tirade at a Seoul restaurant", questioning their legitimacy to challenge her as a lawmaker. This led to public protests.

== See also ==
- Juche
- National Security Act
- National Liberation Faction
- Student movements in Korea
