= Soo-hee =

- Hangul: 수희
- RR: Suhui
- MR: Suhŭi

Soo-hee, also spelled Su-hui, is a Korean given name.

People with this name include:

- Kim Soo-hee (born 1953), South Korean female singer
- Go Soo-hee (born 1976), South Korean actress
- Roh Su-hui, South Korean male political activist arrested for breaking the National Security Act

Fictional characters with this name include:

- Su-hee, in 2006 South Korean film Gangster High
- Chung Soo-hee, in 2006 South Korean television series Goodbye Solo
- Oh Soo-hee, in 2008 South Korean film Forever the Moment
- Jung Soo-hee, in 2009 South Korean television series Good Job, Good Job
- Choi Soo-hee, in 2009 South Korean television series My Too Perfect Sons
- Han Soo-hee, in 2010 South Korean television series Definitely Neighbors
- Kim Soo-hee, in 2010 South Korean television series Road No. 1
- Jin Soo-hee, in 2013 South Korean television series Two Women's Room

== See also ==
- List of Korean given names
