= Lim Su-kyung =

South Korean politician (born 1968)

- 임수경

Member of the National Assembly
- In office 30 May 2012 – 29 May 2016
- Constituency: Proportional Representation №21

Personal details
- Born: 6 November 1968 (age 57) Seoul, South Korea
- Party: Democratic
- Education: Hankuk University of Foreign Studies; Sogang University

- Lim Su-kyung
- Hangul: 임수경
- Hanja: 林秀卿
- RR: Im Sugyeong
- MR: Im Sugyŏng

North Korean name
- Hangul: 림수경
- Hanja: 林秀卿
- RR: Rim Sugyeong
- MR: Rim Sugyŏng

Lim Su-kyung (also spelled Lim Soo-kyung; Korean: 임수경; born 6 November 1968) is a South Korean activist and politician. She is best known for attending the 13th World Festival of Youth and Students, held in North Korea and praising President of North Korea Kim Il Sung in 1989, without first obtaining travel permission from the South Korean government. She attended the festival representing the student organization Jeondaehyop (전대협), now known as Hanchongryun. Upon her return to South Korea, she was arrested and sentenced to twelve years in prison, later commuted to five years of which she served three.

== Visit to North Korea ==
In 1989, Lim (then a 4th year student majoring in French at Hankuk University of Foreign Studies) famously visited North Korea to attend the 13th World Festival of Youth and Students as the one-person delegation of the League of South Korean University Students. Initially, the league was denied permission to send a delegation by South Korean authorities (the Roh Tae-woo administration). Undeterred, the league tasked a student group particularly known for its international connections, Korean Student Christian Federation, with making the visit possible, and so Lim got involved. She was not a student leader but more of a "messenger". An itinerary was carefully planned to get her into North Korea without attracting the attention of South Korean intelligence. She traveled for 10 days to reach the North via Japan and Germany. Her stay there lasted 45 days and culminated in meeting President Kim Il Sung.

Lim crossed the Korean Demilitarized Zone (DMZ) back into South Korea on 15 August 1989. She was the first civilian from either of the two Koreas to openly do so since the end of the Korean War. She was arrested on charges of violating the National Security Act. Some of her student associates were arrested as well. Lim was initially sentenced to prison for 12 years, which was later commuted to five. She ended up serving only three years and was released under a special amnesty. She was pardoned in 1999 by South Korean President Kim Dae-jung. Lim claims that her attendance at the festival was a purely selfless act.

Lim's legacy took two separate trajectories in Korea: in the South, her reputation was tarnished as she was seen to have embarrassed her country's authorities, and in the North, where she is considered a hero. In the South, she is considered one of the most controversial visitors to the North. In the North, Lim was given the nickname Flower of Unification or Flower of Reunification (통일의 꽃) by the North Korean government. She was also made the subject of the documentary Hail Lim Su-kyung, the Flower of Unification (1989).

== Political career ==
In April 2012, she was elected to the 19th National Assembly as the Democratic United Party's 21st proportional representative.

In June 2012, in a confrontation with a North Korean defector in a bar, Lim hurled insults and referred to ruling party lawmaker Ha Tae-keung as a "son-of-a-bitch betrayer" and another as a "traitor" in what was described by Korea JoongAng Daily as "an alcohol-fueled tirade at a Seoul restaurant", questioning their legitimacy to challenge her as a lawmaker. This led to public protests.

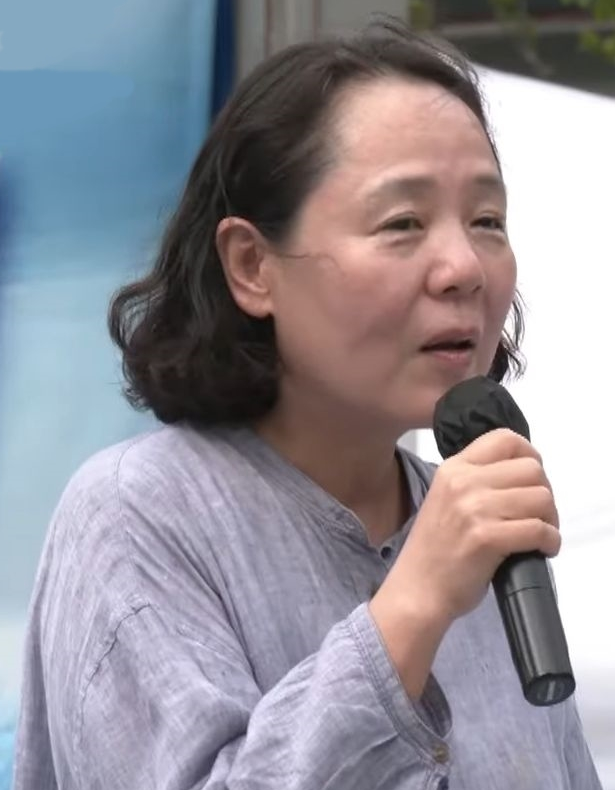
Lim in 2020

The Argentinian filmmaker José Luis García made the 2012 documentary La chica del sur ("The Girl From the South") on Lim and his experience at the 13th World Festival of Youth and Students, where he met her. The film shows Lim's struggle for a reunified Korea in 1989, and two further meetings between her and Garcia in South Korea and Argentina in 2012. La chica del sur tries to show the development of her thoughts and character after years of media attention, prison, the tragic death of her son and divorce. It was shown and awarded in the Buenos Aires International Independent Film Festival (BAFICI) 2012 and Lakino festival 2013. In 2014, the documentary received the Argentine Film Critics Association Silver Condor (Cóndor de Plata) for Best Documentary.

== See also ==
- Juche faction, the South Korean political faction advocating Juche
- Pomchonghakryon, the North Korean organization roughly equivalent to Hanchongryun
- Korean reunification
- Politics of South Korea
- South Korean defectors
- 386 Generation
