= Visa policy of Palau =

Policy on permits required to enter Palau

Most visitors to Palau may obtain a 30-day visa on arrival unless they are citizens from one of the visa-exempt countries or citizens who must obtain a visa in advance.

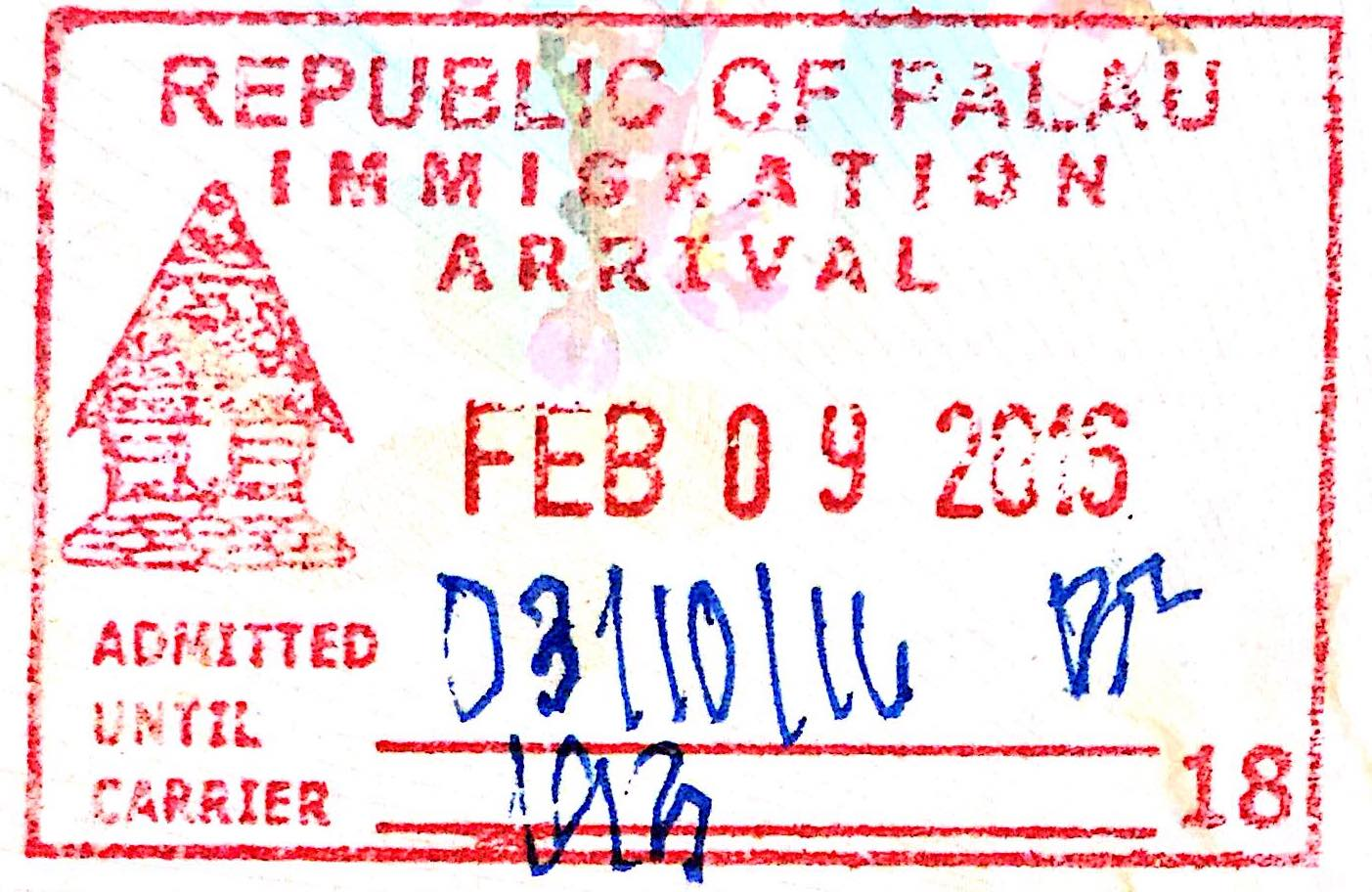
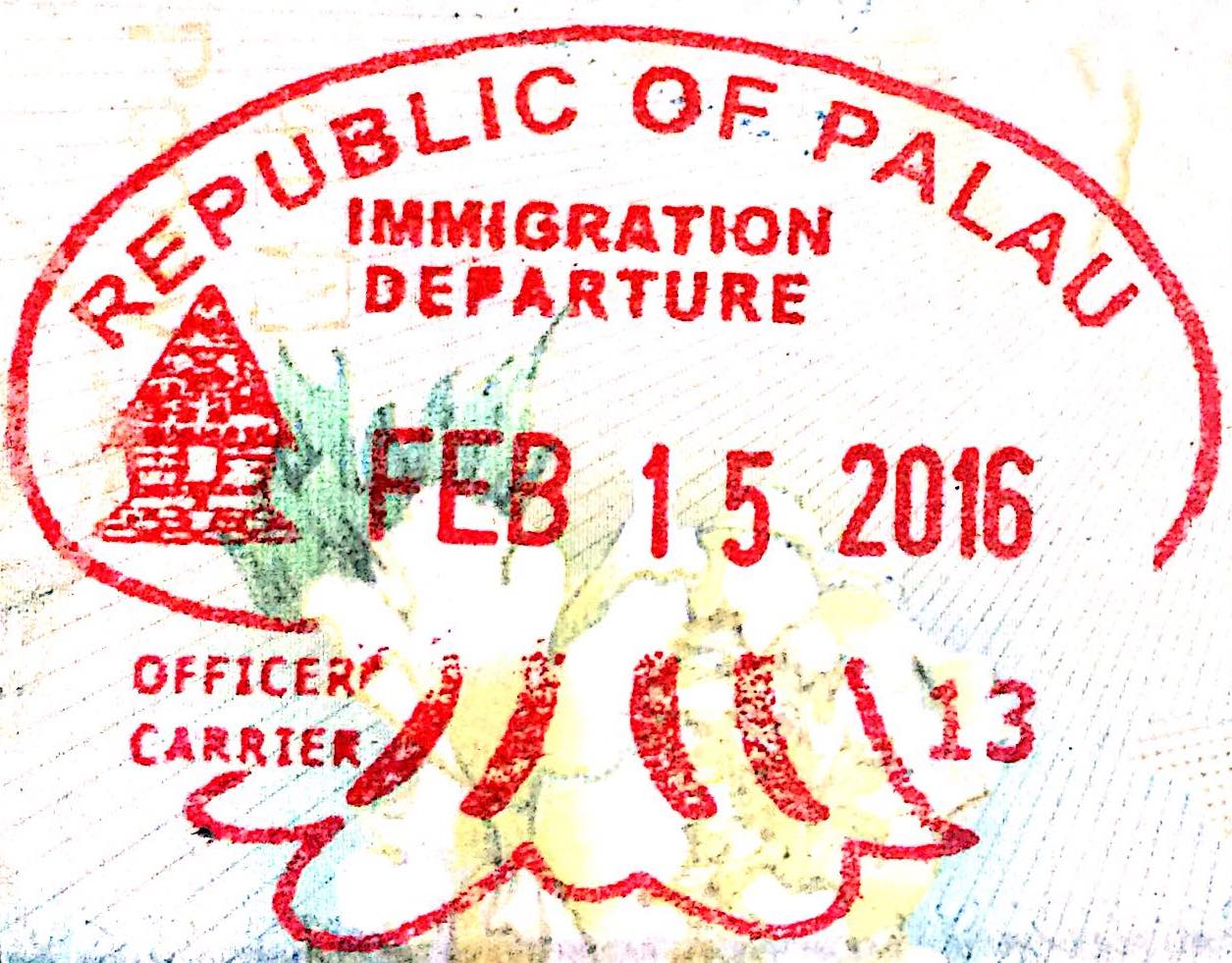
Entry and exit stamps

All visitors arriving in Palau must have a passport valid for at least 6 months.

== Visa policy map ==
Visa policy of Palau Palau Visa not required (1 year) Visa not required (90 days) Visa not required (30 days) Visa on arrival Visa required

== Entry requirements ==
=== Palau pledge ===
All visitors are required to sign the Palau Pledge in front of the immigration officer at the port of entry in order to enter Palau.

== Visa exemption ==
Citizens of the following countries may enter Palau without a visa for the following period in accordance with bilateral agreements:

1 year

- Marshall Islands
- Micronesia
- United States

90 days

- Taiwan

90 days within any 180 days

- European Union member states (except Ireland)

- Iceland
- Liechtenstein
- Norway
- Switzerland

90 days within any 6 months

- Israel

30 days

- Russia
- Seychelles

Date of visa changes
- Unknown: Marshall Islands, Micronesia, United States
- 11 December 2012: Israel
- 1 July 2015: Seychelles
- 8 December 2015: European Union member states (except Ireland), Iceland, Liechtenstein, Norway, Switzerland
- 1 December 2018: Taiwan
- 27 December 2018: Russia

== Visa on arrival ==
Citizens of any countries (except Bangladesh and Myanmar) may obtain a visa on arrival.

The visa is valid for a maximum stay of 30 days but can be extended twice for a fee. In order to obtain a visa on arrival, visitors are required to have a proof of sufficient funds (USD 200 in per week).

== Visa required in advance ==
Citizens of the following countries must obtain a visa in advance:

- Bangladesh
- Myanmar

== Digital Residents ==
Holders of Digital Residency are permitted up to 2 consecutive 90-day extensions during each calendar year after the duration of their initial tourist visa expiring. Per the Root Name System (RNS.id), the issuing agent for Palau IDs and Palau Digital Residency, the purpose of these visa extensions are to facilitate tax residency in Palau by allowing visitors to meet substantial presence tax residency tests of over 180 days.

== See also ==
- Visa requirements for Palauan citizens
