= Pomchonghakryon =

North Korean pro-unification group

- Chosŏn'gŭl: 조국통일범민족청년학생련합 (범청학련)
- Hancha: 祖國統一汎民族青年學生聯合 (汎青學聯)
- Revised Romanization: Joguk Tong-il Beomminjok Cheongnyeon Haksaeng Ryeonhap (Beomcheonghangryeon)
- McCune–Reischauer: Choguk T'ong'il Pŏmminjok Ch'ŏngnyŏn Haksaeng Ryŏnhap (Pŏmch'ŏnghangryŏn)

The National Alliance of Youth and Students for National Reunification (Korean: 조국통일범민족청년학생련합), or the Pomchonghakryon (범청학련), is a North Korea-based organization that promotes Korean reunification. It was founded on 15 August 1992, the 47th anniversary of the end of Japanese occupation on the Korean peninsula.

It considers the South Korea-based Hanchongryun (South Korean Federation of University Student Councils), which was a well-known target of the National Security Act in South Korea, as its southern headquarters. It also has an overseas branch based in Japan. It holds meetings roughly once a year, with the stated goal of ending the foreign domination and intervention in Korea and moving towards peaceful reunification of Korea.

== See also ==
- Korean unification
