= Student movements in Korea =

Student movements have played a significant role in much of modern Korean history. Secondary school and university students have participated in demonstrations and political activism in many forms since the broadening of the standardized education system during early 20th century Japanese colonization. Much of their activism has aligned with broader social movements, such as anti-colonial and pro-independence movements prior to 1945 liberation, pro-democracy activism against authoritarian administrations, and various social issues relating to both student affairs and broader Korean society. Student movements have been largely associated with left-wing politics and interest groups in Korea and their involvement in South Korean politics persists to this day.

== History ==
=== Under Japanese rule ===
==== 1919, participation in the March First Movement ====
The earliest major student movement in modern Korean history was in response to Japanese colonial rule, leading up to the March First Movement for independence. Inspired by U.S. President Woodrow Wilson's call for the self determination of nations, the rebuffing of Korean representatives at the Paris Peace Conference, and the sudden death of the penultimate Korean monarch Gojong, Korean students studying at Japanese universities gathered to produce a declaration of Korean independence. Submitted to the Japanese government, foreign press, embassies, and read in a ceremony at the Joseon Christian Youth Association Hall in Tokyo on February 8, 1919, the declaration and subsequent arrests of the student activists stirred domestic sentiments for political independence.

The subsequent March First Movement began as decentralized mass protests in Seoul, Pyeongyang, and Gwangju, before spreading into rural areas. Students of all levels participated in demonstrations, with contemporary international newspapers reporting female secondary students' involvement.

==== June 10, 1926 student protest ====
On June 10, 1926, the funeral date of Emperor of Korea Sunjong, secondary and university students in Seoul staged a protest and distributed a manifesto calling for Korean independence. Over 200 students were arrested.

==== Gwangju student movement November 1929 – March 1930 ====
The Gwangju student movement formed in response to ethnic discrimination against Korean students in the colonial education system.

On October 30, 1929, racially motivated harassment of female Korean students by Japanese students lead to a clash aboard a commuter train between students of both ethnicities. Skirmishes amongst students persisted over the following days on train cars and platforms, culminating in a city-wide protest across multiple secondary schools on November 3, 1929. The Japanese colonial government repressed news coverage of the event.

=== After 15 August 1945 liberation ===
==== April Revolution of 1960 ====
On April 11, 1960, the body of a high school boy with a police tear-gas grenade lodged in his skull was pulled out of a river in the southeastern port city of Masan (now a district of Changwon). The student had gone missing during his participation in the prior demonstrations against the rigging of the March 15, 1960 presidential elections. The city erupted into three days of spontaneous protests and violent clashes with police, while news of the incident and downplaying by the Syngman Rhee presidential administration further incensed national anti-authoritarian sentiments.

On April 18, 1960, several student leaders at Korea University in Seoul mobilized 3,000 students in a march to the National Assembly building. The march and sit-ins were met by physical violence from gangs associated with the Rhee government. The next day, over 100,000 high school and university students from 30 educational institutions marched on the presidential residence, calling for Rhee's resignation. Police opened fire on protestors, killing over 180 people. Rhee declared martial law in order to repress further demonstrations. These events came to be known as the April Revolution, and resulted in the eventual resignation of President Rhee on April 26, 1960.

==== 1970–1980 ====
During the 1980s, student movements in Korea were an important force in the political climate of South Korea. The Gwangju Massacre in May 1980 triggered stronger revolutionary sentiments in student movements, especially Marxist perspectives.

The generation that lead the student movements have come to be known as the 386 Generation, who had witnessed and experienced the political repression of both student and labor groups first-hand.

After tumultuous decades of liberation, the Rhee regime, and the Korean War, the South Korean government aimed to suppress all forms of political dissidence. All dissidence was treated as pro-communist and pro-North Korea, subject to prosecution under the National Security Act. In addition to violent political suppression, the country also underwent rapid state-led capitalist reform and industrialization. The Yushin Constitution codified President Park Chung Hee's dictatorial rule and justified human rights abuses and restrictions in the name of modernization.

The Yushin system led to great discontent amongst intellectuals and students in the 1970s. Many university campuses became spaces for antigovernment activism, where dissidence was practiced in small reading groups and educational activities. Many were facilitated by religious human rights organizations in order to evade governmental scrutiny.

Students also became involved in distributing critical opinions through an underground press. Many students who were expelled due to these activities are believed to have gone into the publishing industry, where journalists critical of the regime formed the Council for Democratic Press (민주언론시민연합).

The student movement of the 1980s were divided into three main political camps. The National Liberation (NL), the National Democracy (ND) and the People's Democracy (PD). Although they constituted different political views, the groups facilitated several organizations and collectively mobilized two major demonstrations. In the June Democratic Struggle of 1987, over 1 million people attended an illegal street demonstration in Seoul, leading to sweeping political changes and a direct presidential election. The second protest came to be known as the Great Worker Struggle, which expanded possibilities for trade union movements.

==== January 1987 torture and death of Park Jong Chul ====
The Chun Doo Hwan administration's violent suppression of political demonstrations included the torture of citizens and students by police.

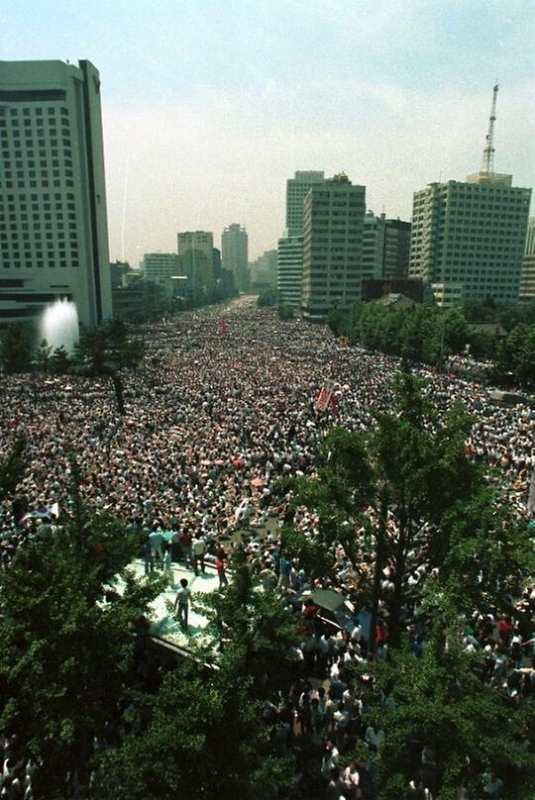
The funeral of student activist Lee Han-yeol drew a crowd of over 1 million in the streets of Seoul on July 9, 1987.

Park Jong Chul was a Seoul National University student who died under police custody. The death was initially described as one from shock, though it was later revealed in an autopsy that the student had been killed by waterboarding. The news triggered a memorial rally and further incited anti-governmental sentiment and protests.

==== June 1987 death of Lee Han Yeol ====
As demonstrations intensified, students at Yonsei University held a demonstration on a campus field on June 9, 1987. During the protest, student Lee Han Yeol was seriously injured by a tear gas grenade penetrating his skull. He died from his injuries on July 5, with news of his martyrdom increasing citizens' distrust of the Chun administration.

These events culminated in the June Democracy Movement. Chun ultimately agreed to a constitutional revision that established a system of direct election for president.

== Present ==
=== 2008 candlelight vigil ===
After the discovery of mad cow disease in the United States, a candle light vigil was held to oppose the import of beef into South Korea from the United States. In response, the South Korean government initially suspended the import of beef. However, on April 11, 2008, the Lee Myung Bak government initiated a deal with the U.S. to resume importation. This sparked criticism that the government had "sold the people's life and health".

On May 2, 2008, students and citizens held another candle light vigil in opposition to beef imports. At the first meeting, more than sixty percent of the participants were high school girls. The vigil continued for more than one hundred days, pushing the issue into political discussion. Hundreds of thousands of people participated in the rally during its peak in June and July, to which the government mobilized police and arrested a large number of participants. The demonstrators were put on trial for assembly and demonstration, and obstruction of ordinary traffic.

=== 2011 demonstration for university tuition ===
In his election pledge, President Lee Myung Bak promised to lower university tuition. Failure to fulfill the pledge was attributed to funding challenges. College students and associated organizations demanded that the government fulfill its promises, claiming that tuition was too expensive and students forced to work part-time jobs could not attend to their school work. Civil society and the university students demonstrated every day, with students performing the symbolic 10,000 bae, or 10,000 bows, representing the sacrifice of 10,000 earthly desires. Ultimately, the government did not implement the promised half-tuition fee, but did increase government scholarships for low-income students.

=== 2015–16 demonstration for comfort women agreement ===
A number of NGOs and international organizations had been engaged in the addressing and investigation of the so called "comfort women issue" since the 1990s. On December 28, 2015, South Korea and Japan came to an agreement regarding the "comfort women," or abducted Korean women who were forced to work as sex slaves for Japanese soldiers during World War II. Representatives of colleges and citizen activists declared this agreement to be inadequate. Choi Eun Hye, student body president of Ewha Womans University, stated that "The voice of the victims was excluded" and "There wasn't an apology from Japan. It is a disgraceful agreement. Comfort women victims desired to be made clear about responsibility for forced mobilized labour at national level, formal apology, legal compensation, recording on textbook and punishment. So that the same thing and victimization would not occur again in this land."

Student demonstrations were held at Kyonggi University at Seoul, Kyunghee University, Korea University, Dongguk University, Busan College of Education, Pusan National University, Sogang University, Seoul National University, Sungshin Women’s University, Sejong University, Yonsei University, Ewha Womans University, Hakuk University of Foreign Studies, Hanyang University, and Hongik University with attendees including 25 student body presidents and 250 national university student unions.

Activists, including many students, staged various protests against the agreement as late as January 2016.

=== 2024–25 presidential impeachment protests ===
University students and youth were prominently involved in the protests triggered by President Yoon Suk Yeol’s declaration of martial law and subsequent impeachment proceedings.

== See also ==
- Hanchongryun
