= Palauan passport =

Passport

- Palauan passport front cover
- Type: Passport
- Issued by: Palau
- Purpose: Identification
- Eligibility: Palauan citizenship
- Expiration: 10 years

The Palauan passport is an international travel document that is issued to Palauan citizens which is issued centrally at the Passport Office in Meyuns, Palau.

== History ==
Issuance of the Palauan passport began on 8 December 1994, whilst official and diplomatic passports were first issued on 9 December 1994.

In accordance with law RPPL7-3, on 31 December 2006, all non-machine readable Palauan passports automatically expired and from 1 January 2007 onwards, only machine readable Palauan passports are valid travel documents, even if a non-machine readable passport has not yet reached its expiry date.

== Visa requirements ==
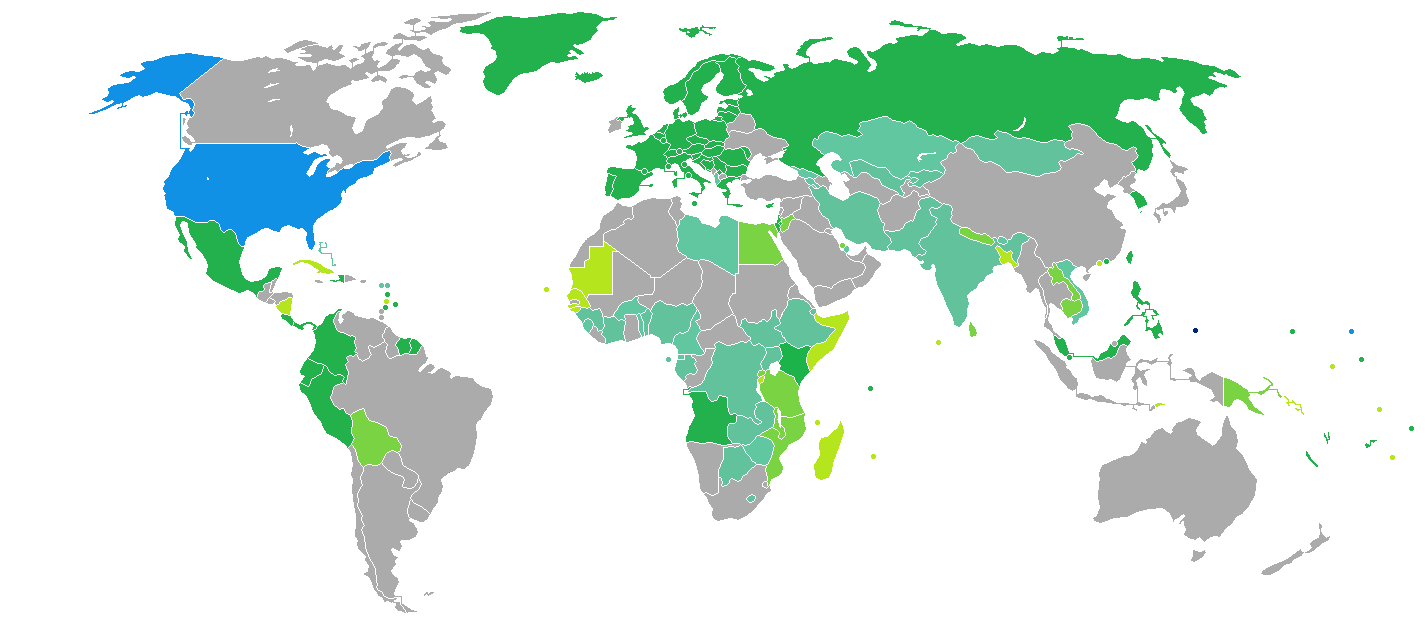
Visa requirements for Palauan citizens Palau Visa-free Visa on arrival

As of 2 July 2024, Palauan citizens had visa-free or visa on arrival access to 122 countries and territories, ranking the Palauan passport 48th in terms of travel freedom according to the Henley Passport Index.

Palau signed a mutual visa waiver agreement with Schengen Area countries on 7 December 2015.

== Application ==
Applying for an ordinary Palauan passport currently costs USD50.

== See also ==
- Visa requirements for Palauan citizens
