= Hanchongnyon =

South Korean pro-North Korean group

- South Korean Federation of University Students Councils
- Hangul: 한국대학총학생회연합
- Hanja: 韓國大學總學生會聯合
- RR: Hanguk daehak chonghaksaenghoe yeonhap
- MR: Han'guk taehak ch'onghaksaenghoe yŏnhap

Short name
- Hangul: 한총련
- Hanja: 韓總聯
- RR: Hanchongnyeon
- MR: Hanch'ongnyŏn

Hanchongnyon (Korean: 한총련), short for Hanguk Daehak Chonghaksaenghoi ryonhap (한국대학총학생회연합) and also known as the Confederation of Korean Students' Union or the South Korean Federation of University Students Councils, is a pro-North Korea leftist student organization in South Korea. It was founded in 1993 as a successor to the Jeondaehyop (전대협) student organization, inheriting its activist legacy from the National Liberation faction (민족해방) of the South Korean student movement.

== History ==
Hanchongnyon was officially established on May 29, 1993, at Korea University. The organization's initial slogan was "Community of Life, Academics, and Struggle," which was later changed to "Invincible Patriotic Ranks Pioneering the Nation's Destiny" in 1995. The organization condemns the continued presence of the United States Forces Korea (USFK), which it sees as a humiliating vestige of U.S. imperialism, and advocates on behalf of Korean reunification. Hanchongnyon is widely known for its efforts to challenge the South Korean state, mainly through demonstrations. Its main headquarters were Korea University (Seoul) and Chonnam University (Gwangju). The ideological roots of the organisation can be traced to the mid-1980s, when radical students and intellectuals had become increasingly aware of the North Korean Juche ideology, some of whom reacted to it favorably and began to agitate in favor of the North and against the traditional pro-American South Korean state.

=== 1996 Yonsei University Incident ===
In August 1996, a Hanchongnyon protest was held at Yonsei University, where harsh criticisms were levied against then-president Kim Young-sam. The students also voiced support for North Korea's preferred policies regarding reunification and inter-Korean relations. After North Korea began to use the demonstration as part of its own state propaganda, the Kim government forcefully dispersed the demonstration. As a result, one policeman died and hundreds on both sides were injured before police finally raided the campus building and detained 3,500 protestors. Most were released from the police stations the next day, but 280 were formally arrested and charged for violating the National Security Act and other statutes. Kim vowed to root out pro-North radicals from universities and held a meeting with 300 university administrators to discuss methods to do so. The move was not without controversy, with some drawing comparisons to the 1980 Gwangju Uprising.

== Legal Status and Controversies ==
Hanchongnyon was criminalized under the National Security Act in 1999 for alleged pro-North Korean activities. The North Korea-based Pomchonghakryon considers the Hanchongnyon as its southern headquarters. In 1998, the Supreme Court of South Korea officially designated Hanchongnyon as an "enemy-benefiting organization" under the National Security Act. This designation was reaffirmed for the 10th Hanchongnyon in 2004, with the court stating that despite some changes in its charter and regulations, there had been no fundamental change in its ideology and objectives. The criminalization of Hanchongnyon led to a significant increase in National Security Act violations. Between 1997 and 2001, 594 individuals were detained, with 560 facing trial for their involvement with the organization. In 2005, the United Nations Human Rights Committee ruled that punishing Hanchongnyon delegates solely for their membership violated the International Covenant on Civil and Political Rights, specifically Article 22 on freedom of association and Article 18 on freedom of thought and conscience.

== Decline ==
As the Soviet Union collapsed and the North Korean famine occurred, many of the North-friendly groups lost popularity, and many activists later stated they became more skeptical towards North Korea. By the mid-2000s, Hanchongnyon had become largely inactive. In 2008, the organization failed to elect a new chairperson for the first time in its 16-year history, indicating a significant decline in its operations and influence.

== See also ==
- Chongryon
- Education in South Korea
- Politics of South Korea
- Democratic Labor Party (South Korea)
- Progressive Party (South Korea, 2017)
- Juchesasangpa, the South Korean political organization advocating Juche
- Student movements in Korea
