= Roh Su-hui =

South Korean political activist (1944–2025)

- 노수희
- Born: 1944
- Died: 6 November 2025 (aged 81)
- Criminal charge: Violating the National Security Act
- Penalty: Four years in prison, followed by three years of stripped suffrage

Korean name
- Hangul: 노수희
- Hanja: 盧秀熙
- RR: No Suhui
- MR: No Suhŭi

Roh Su-hui (Note: Also spelled Ro Su-hui and No Su-hui) (Korean: 노수희; 1944 – 6 November 2025) was a South Korean political activist. He gained notoriety in 2012 for breaching the National Security Act, being arrested after an unofficial visit to North Korea.

== Biography ==
Roh was the vice-chairman of the South Headquarters of the Pan-national Alliance for Korea's Reunification (Pomminryon). He was described by NBC News as "a leader of a South Korean group that has maintained friendly ties with North Korean groups".

=== Arrest ===
Roh was arrested in July 2012 after he returned from an unauthorized visit to North Korea, via the Joint Security Area (JSA) in Panmunjom, where he called for the reunification of the two Koreas and bitterly criticized President Lee Myung-bak of South Korea for his hard-line North Korea policy. At the JSA, he was sent off by a large group of North Korean civilians waving the flag of reunified Korea and carrying bouquets of flowers. Associated Press film footage of the event showed Ro's approach to the border-line while a large group of South Korean security officials, South Korean Army personnel assigned to the Joint Security Area (JSA) and military policemen were already awaiting his crossing in preparation for his arrest. Mere moments after crossing the border into South Korea, he was immediately seized and carried away (he had struggled against his captors), while the by-now furious North Koreans behind the border hurled insults at and fiercely protested the action. No North Korean border guards present intervened. He had entered North Korea via China in March for a memorial service marking the 100th day since the death of ruler Kim Jong-il. In February 2013, he was sentenced to four years in prison, and the Seoul Central District Court also ordered that his rights, such as suffrage, be stripped for three years after his release from prison. He was released from prison in July 2016.

The court ruling said "stern punishment is inevitable because [Ro] made a secret visit to North Korea without permission". Another activist, Won Jin-wook, received a three-year prison sentence for communicating with North Korean officials to arrange Ro's trip.

=== Reactions ===
The arrest of Roh was described by American-based NK News as "a clear but unnecessary propaganda victory" for North Korea. An article in The Guardian mused: "The arrest made a very small splash in the western media, which comes as little surprise because a story with a warm North and a cold South doesn't square easily with the message that has been delivered by media outlets in Europe and the US for the last two decades."

North Korea's state news agency said the "arrest has pushed the people in the Democratic People's Republic of Korea [North Korea] into fury" and described it as an abuse of human rights.

=== Death ===
Roh died on 6 November 2025, at the age of 81.

== See also ==
- Korean reunification
