= National Security Act (South Korea) =

Law concerning anti-state activities

- Emblem of South Korea

Constituent National Assembly
- Citation: Act No. 10 of 1948
- Territorial extent: Worldwide
- Passed: 19 November 1948
- Effective: 1 December 1948
- Administered by: Ministry of Justice

Legislative history
- Bill title: National Security Act Bill (국가보안법안)
- Committee responsible: Legislation and Judiciary
- First reading: 9 and 18 November 1948
- Second reading: 19 November 1948
- Voting summary: 84 voted for; 3 voted against
- Committee report: Report on wording corrections to the National Security Act Bill, 20 November 1948

Related legislation
- Anti-Communism Act (Act No. 643 of 1961)

Constitutional Court of Korea cases
- 89Hun-Ka113 (1990); 90Hun-Ma82 (1992); 2002Hun-Ka5 (2002)

Summary
- Regulates anti-state activities considered to endanger national security
- Status: In force (amended)

- National Security Act
- Hangul: 국가보안법
- Hanja: 國家保安法
- RR: Gukga boanbeop
- MR: Kukka poanpŏp

The National Security Act is a South Korean law that entered force on December 1, 1948, under the government of Syngman Rhee, with the stated purpose of ensuring "the security of the State and the subsistence and freedom of nationals, by regulating any anticipated activities compromising the safety of the State."

In 2004, legislators of the then-majority Uri Party attempted to annul the act but failed due to opposition from the Grand National Party. Poll results in 2004 and 2005 from the media cartel Chojoongdong showed that more than half of the Korean people opposed the abolition of the act. A survey in 2021 showed that support for abolition of Article 7 of the act at 45%, while opposition stood at 40%. A planned repeal of the Act in 2021, spearheaded by Democratic lawmaker Min Hyung-bae, was again unsuccessful.

The South Korean Constitution nominally guarantees freedom of speech, press, petition and assembly for its nationals. However, expressions or actions in favor of North Korea can be punished by the National Security Law. Communist parties are legal as long as they do not act in a manner "contrary to the democratic basic order" of South Korea.

The law has faced criticism due to perceived encroachment on freedom of expression and its links to the colonial-era Peace Preservation Law.

== Legislative history ==
The National Security Act was drafted by the Constituent National Assembly's Legislation and Judiciary Committee and introduced on 9 November 1948, at the 99th Plenary Session.

The bill's first reading began on 9 November. After the reading was interrupted and the bill was returned to the committee for revision (a new version had to be drafted and reported upon by 11 November). The Assembly resumed consideration resumed on 18 November.

On 19 November, the Assembly approved the bill as a whole by 84 votes to 3, with 121 members present. The same motion waived the third reading and referred the bill to the Legislation and Judiciary Committee for editorial revisions.

The Act entered into force on 1 December, 1948.

== Origins ==
The National Security Act was reportedly inherited from the Peace Preservation Law which had been used to suppress the Korean independence movement during the Japanese colonial period.

The Act was enacted by the Constituent National Assembly of South Korea under the presidency of Syngman Rhee, just months after the founding of the Republic of Korea. Rhee's First Republic subsequently developed into an authoritarian dictatorship.

An earlier law on "Anti-government Organizations" aimed to suppress any "domestic or foreign organization or group which uses the title of the government fraudulently or aims at a rebellion against the State, and which is provided with a command and leadership system."

All of the following were made illegal: recognition of North Korea as a political entity; organizations advocating the overthrow of the government; the printing, distributing, and ownership of "anti-government" material; and any failure to report such violations by others.

The law has been reformed and strengthened over the past few decades, and was merged with the Anti-Communism Law during the 1980s. The 1991 amendment removed a clause that considered all foreign communist nations as anti-state forces.

According to some analysts, the National Security Act can be viewed as a product of the Cold War and the national division of Korea. After World War II, Korean politics were highly polarized, forcing Koreans to adopt the left-right political spectrum. This created a reality of "one nation-two states" on the Korean peninsula. The ensuing tensions culminated in the Korean War between 1950 and 1953.

This act has been acknowledged by some politicians, scholars, and activists as a symbol of the anti-communism of South Korea's dictatorial First Republic and a potential restriction on freedom of speech, since the act not only regulates activities that directly threaten the safety of the state, but also punishes those who praise or promote an anti-state group. According to a report written by Amnesty International, the most widely used clause of the National Security Act is:

"Any person who praises, incites or propagates the activities of an antigovernment organization, a member thereof or of the person who has received an order from it, or who acts in concert with it, or propagates or instigates a rebellion against the State, with the knowledge of the fact that it may endanger the existence and security of the State or democratic fundamental order, shall be punished by imprisonment for not more than seven years"

Due to its extensive nature and high risk of false accusations, this act also penalizes false accusations and fabrication of evidence. For example, a violator of Article 12 of the National Security Act may receive the same sentence that the victim would have if the violator's crime had not been undisclosed.

== Administration ==
Since 1978, the South Korean High Court has classified 1,220 books and other print materials as "Enemy's Expressions" through judicial precedent. Two government-established research institutes decide what books and printed materials meet the criteria of "Enemy's Expressions": the Democratic Ideology Institute, established in 1997 under direct orders from the Chief Prosecutor, and the Public Safety Affairs Institute of the Korea National Police University.

In 2012, a South Korean man named Park Jung-geun, was indicted and charged under the National Security Act for reposting altered North Korean propaganda on social media. The man, who described his use of the material as intended to lampoon the North Korean regime, received a ten-month suspended prison sentence.

During the Lee Myung-bak government, some South Korean military officers were arrested for suspected pro-North Korean and pro-communist activities.

In 2026, the special counsel investigating the insurrection case of former President Yoon Suk Yeol regarding the 2024 South Korean martial law crisis accused Yoon of being anti-state forces, involving acts "such as armed soldiers storming the National Assembly and the National Election Commission and attempts to cut power and water to media outlets."

On 31 May 1991, Article 1(2) was inserted to prevent its arbitrary application: "In the construction and application of this Act, it shall be limited to the minimum necessary in its construction and application to attain the aforementioned purpose, and shall not be permitted to construe this Act extensively, or to restrict unreasonably the fundamental human rights of citizens guaranteed by the Constitution."

== Controversies ==
Amnesty International reported that 90 people were charged under the National Security Act in 2011, and that number increased by 95.6% between 2008 and 2011. It described the National Security Act as a tool to "harass and arbitrarily prosecute individuals and civil society organizations who are peacefully exercising their rights to freedom of expression, opinion and association" and to "remove people who are perceived to threaten established political views, to prevent people from taking part in discussions surrounding relations with North Korea."

In 1998, Ha Young-joon, a graduate student at Hanyang University, formerly active with the International Socialists movement, was tried and sentenced to 8 months in prison for having summarized and made available online Chris Harman and Alex Callinicos's main writings on South Korea's national BBS network, in violation of the NSA Article 7 Clauses 1 and 5.

In 2002, a new recruit in the South Korean Army, surnamed Lee, was sentenced to two years in prison for having said to fellow soldiers, "I think Korean separation is not the fault of the North Koreans but [of] the Americans." The Military Prosecutor's Office could not charge him for his comment alone with violating the law, but it searched the recruit's civilian home and found various illicit books and charged him with violating the NSA under Article 7, Clauses 1 and 5.

In 2012, Roh Su-hui was arrested after he returned from an unauthorized visit to North Korea. The arrest was described by NK News as "a clear but unnecessary propaganda victory" for North Korea.

The Journalists Association of Korea issued an official statement in 2007 that the National Security Act reduced the status of South Korea to a "third world country" due to its infringement of human rights. Rhyu Si-min of the People's Participation Party was interviewed by the Pyeonghwa Bangsong radio and criticized the existence of the NSA as a "60-year-old political tool" of public oppression. Louisa Lim of the American NPR also criticized the increased use of the NSA under the Lee Myung-bak government. One of the 33 victims of the Osonghoe Incident, Chae Gyu-gu, said that "the National Security Act must disappear" in order to prevent innocent South Korean citizens from being falsely accused.

Other well-known uses of the National Security Act include the 1999 banning of the students' union Hanchongryun and the 2003 spy case against Song Du-yul, a Korean living in Germany. The severest penalty that could be given in accordance with NSL is the death penalty. The best-known example of the death penalty is the People's Revolutionary Party Incident, where eight citizens were falsely charged and executed.

- On 12 June 2011, the South Korean government officially apologized to the family members of South Korean citizen Kim Bok-jae, who was wrongfully accused of being a spy for North Korea under the NSA.
- On 15 August 2011, the South Korean government officially apologized to a 54-year-old South Korean citizen, Ku Myeong-u (구명우), who was wrongfully accused of being a spy for North Korea by working in a Chongryon-affiliated company in Japan.
- On 23 September 2011, the Seoul High Court officially apologized to Zainichi Koreans Kim Jeong-sa (김정사) and Yoo Seong-sam (유성삼), who were wrongfully accused of being spies during the Zainichi Korean Spy Incident.
- On 10 October 2011, the Changwen Regional Court formally posthumously apologized to the now-deceased Lee Sang-cheol (이상철), a South Korean fisherman who was kidnapped by North Koreans for one year but was wrongfully accused of being a spy by the regional prosecutors.
- On 10 November 2011, the Supreme Court ruled that the South Korean government should compensate the 33 individuals who were involved in the 1982 Osonghoe Incident.
- On 25 December 2011, the Gwangju High Court issued an apology to two South Korean fishermen (one deceased) with the last names of Kim and Lee, who were wrongfully accused of being North Korean spies during the Fourth Republic and the Fifth Republic.
- On 22 May 2012, the Supreme Court issued an apology to the deceased Byeon Du-gab (변두갑), who was wrongfully arrested for allegedly spying for a North Korean spy in 1970.

== See also ==
- Peace Preservation Law (Japan)
- Patriot Act (United States)
- Communist Control Act (United States)
- McCarthyism
- Government of South Korea
- Politics of South Korea
- Division of Korea
- Uri Party - This party was the only (historical) liberal ruling party in South Korea that has ever tried to abolish the NSA.
- Labor Party (South Korea) - South Korea's few existing socialist political party that do not violate the National Security Act.
- National Intelligence Service (South Korea)
- Category:Organizations banned under the National Security Act (South Korea)
